= The Last Judgment (Kavertzas) =

c. 1640 painting by Franghias Kavertzas

The Second Coming
- Δευτέρα Παρουσία (Greek), Il Giudizio Universale (Italian)
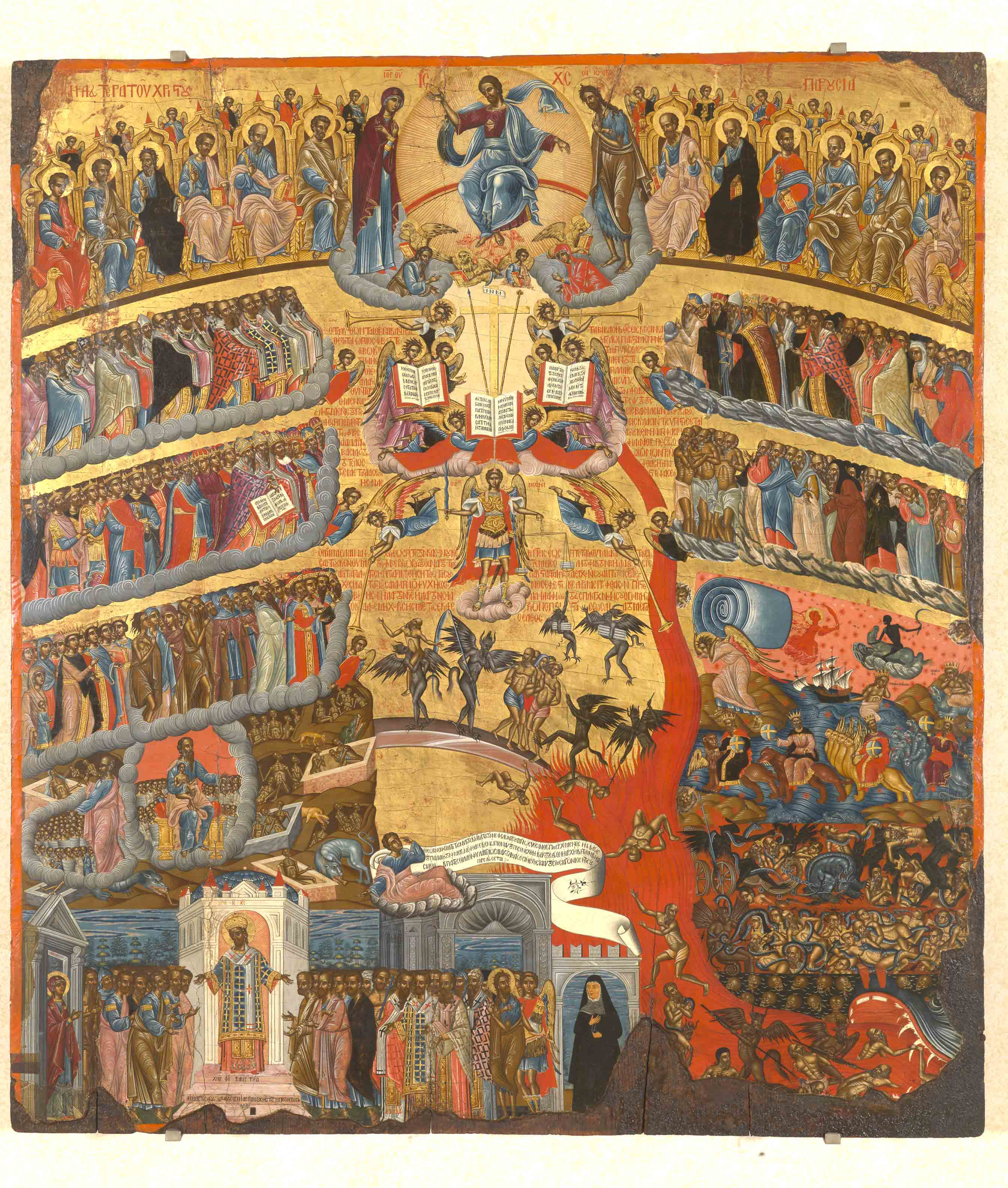
- Artist: Francheskos Kavertzas
- Year: c. 1640–1641
- Medium: tempera on wood
- Movement: Late Cretan school
- Subject: The Last Judgment
- Dimensions: 138 cm × 124.5 cm (54.3 in × 49 in)
- Location: Hellenic Institute of Venice, Venice
- Owner: Hellenic Institute of Venice
- Website: eib.xanthi.ilsp.gr/gr/icons.asp (in Greek)

The Last Judgment also known as The Second Coming is an egg tempera painting by Francheskos Kavertzas. His artistic period was during the first half of the 17th century. Seven of his works survived, five were signed. He was a member of the late Cretan school. The Last Judgment painted by Georgios Klontzas inspired countless Cretan artists, Kavertzas was one of them. Kavertzas's painting In You Rejoiceth strongly resembles Klontzas's In Thee Rejoiceth. Leos Moskos was also inspired by Klontzas's work. He also painted a similar version of The Last Judgment. The final judgment is the last judgment of every person on earth. The painting is a pictural representation of that event. The Kavertzas The Last Judgment is unique because it features a nun. Her name was Evgenia Trapezontiopoulla. According to records on March 9, 1641, the nun could not afford to pay for the painting. Kavertzas and the nun bartered instead. The painting is part of the collection of the Hellenic Institute of Venice in Italy.

== Description ==
The work is egg tempera and gold leaf on wood with dimensions of 138 cm (54.3 in) × 124.5 cm (49 in). The painting was finished in 1641. At the top part of the icon, Jesus lies on the vertical axis of the image. John the Baptist is to his left, he is followed by six apostles. The Virgin Mary is to his right followed by the other six apostles. Directly below Jesus, a band introduces the Second Coming. The book of life is open. Kavertsas follows the prototype established by earlier artists. Below the musical ensemble also on the vertical axis, the Archangel Michael holds a sword in his right hand and the traditional scale on his left. The scale represents the weighing of souls.

Below Michael, after the demons, the prophet Daniel lies on a cloud next to the Old Testament that refers to his vision of the coming of the Son of Man. To our left three rows transcend downwards featuring, clergy, kings, nobles, and righteous woman. Below the apostles to our right, a group of half-naked men are waiting to be judged followed by a group of people. Below the group, an angle carries a scroll with the names of mankind to be judged. Behind the angel, a red angel is depicted next to the grim reaper holding his scythe. The figure gives viewers the 17th century depiction of Death.

Below death and the red angel, a ship is traveling in the water. Four crowned figures ride unique animals. Below the crowned figures a huge scene depicting hell appears. Dragons, demons, and snakes are present. The snakes are wrapped around the damned. Kavertzas's demons resemble Klontzas's demons. In the lower-left corner, below the resurrection of the dead, paradise appears with Christ as High-Priest welcoming the righteous to the Gates of Paradise. The Virgin Mary is in the other doorway and the last doorway is occupied by a nun. She was the patron Evgenia Trapezontiopoulla. Her name is also mentioned in the inscription and historical archives.

== Gallery ==
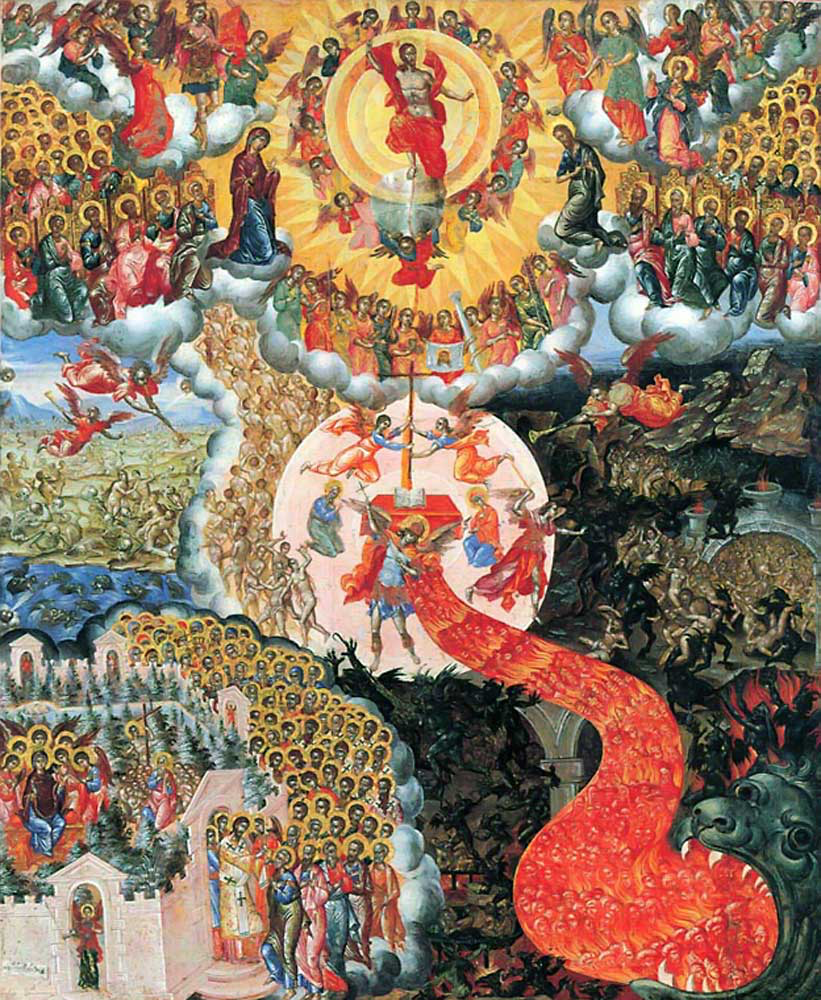
The Last Judgement (Moskos)

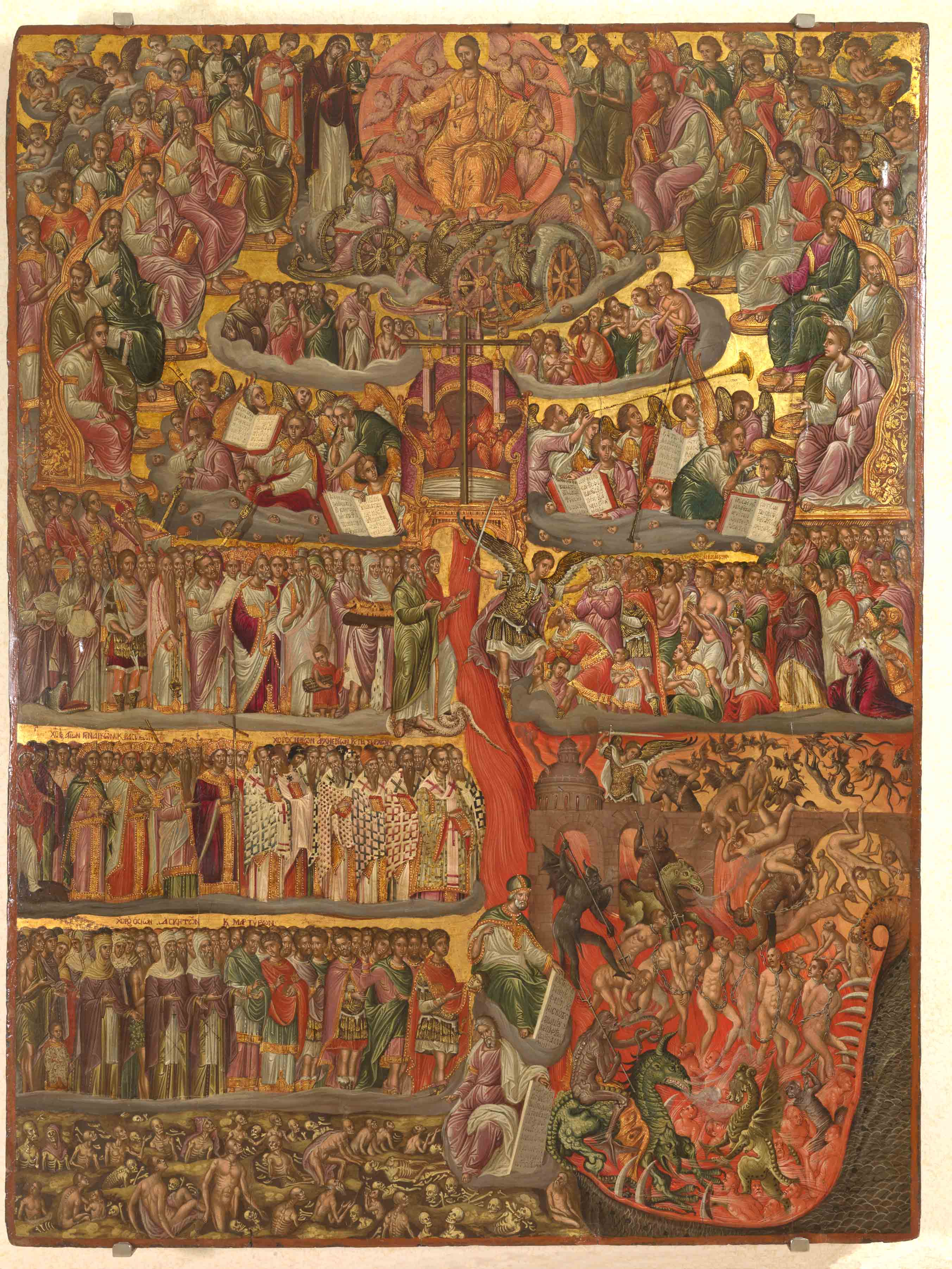
The Last Judgement (Klontzas)
