= The Last Judgment (Moskos) =

Painting by Leos Moskos

- Δευτέρα Παρουσία (Greek), Il Giudizio Universale (Italian)
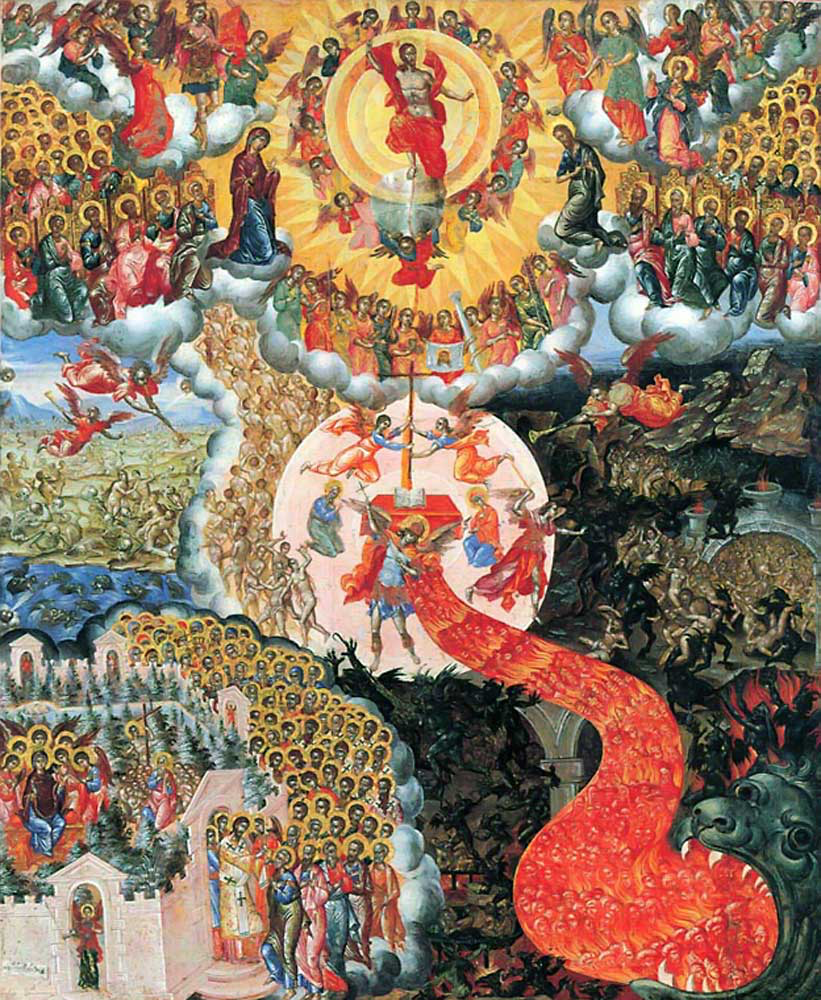
- Artist: Leos Moskos
- Year: c. 1653
- Medium: tempera on wood
- Movement: Late Cretan School
- Subject: The Last Judgement
- Dimensions: 61 cm × 24 cm (49.8 in × 19.6 in)
- Location: Collection of Marianna Latsi, Athens, Greece
- Owner: Marianna Latsi

The Last Judgment also known as the Second Coming is a painting by Leos Moskos. His artistic legacy was during the 17th century. Twenty of his paintings survived. He shared the same last name as Elias Moskos and Ioannis Moskos, they may have been related. All three painters flourished during the same period. Moskos worked all over Europe namely, Crete, Zakynthos, and Venice. His student was famous painter Nikolaos Doxaras.

The Last Judgment is a theme covered by many Greek and Italian artists since the inception of the new religion. The event is the last judgment of mankind on earth. The painting is a pictural representation of that event. Georgios Klontzas painted his own version of The Last Judgment. The artist inspired many local Cretan artists. Francheskos Kavertzas also created his own version of The Last Judgment. The Last Judgment by Leos Moskos is in the collection Marianna Latsi. The artwork is frequently exhibited in different museums all over the world namely in Greece.

== Description ==
The Last Judgment is a tempera painting on gold leaf and wood panel. The height is 61 cm (24 in) and the width is 49.8 cm (19.6 in). The work was completed in 1653. In the upper portion of the painting, Christ appears in the center. He takes on the form of the resurrection. The Virgin Mary is to our left, behind her are six apostles. John the Baptist is to our right, the remaining six apostles are behind him. Jesus is surrounded by a circle of angels. To his left and right, a large group of individuals are part of the Last Judgement dance. The kings, hierarchs, martyrs, holy women, and monks are present. Directly below Christ, an angel holds a sphere on his shoulders. Below the angel, a procession is gathered holding symbols of the passion sequence. The Spear of Destiny, the marble column of the flagellation of Jesus and the holy towel are part of the scene. Below the scene, a cross adorns the center of the image above a holy altar. Below the cross, on the holy altar the book of life is opened. An inscription reads: saved are the believers. To the left and right of the center are two angels playing horns.

To the left of the central circle under the musical angels, the earth is depicted flat. In the background, mountains are present. On land, the dead are rising. The dead are initially depicted as skeletons but eventually, they take human form. The four winds from Greek mythology are also present in the form of heads. Two are in the sky and another two are in the water. They are also known as the Anemoi.

In the lower-left portion of the painting, paradise is depicted. A similar scene exists in Franghias Kavertzas's Last Judgment. Jesus takes on the form of high-priest welcoming the righteous to the gates of paradise. Christ is with three angels receiving Saint Peter. Inside the castle-like structure, the Virgin Mary is surrounded by overgrown shrubs and low trees. She is also surrounded by six guardian angels. To her left, she is worshiped by Abraham and the penitent thief. The other gates are guarded by armed angels. On the wall of the castle, the artist signed and dated the work.

At the entrance of Hell the Archangel Michael feeds the unworthy into a lave-like substance. Another angel holds back the unleashed demons preventing the dark creatures from entering the center of the image above the lava. The lave leads to a huge mouth that represents the gateway of hell. Demons surround the lower right portion of the painting. Both Klontzas's Last Judgment and Kavertzas's Last Judgment also depict similar dark creatures. The demons are carrying the unworthy on their backs.

== Gallery ==
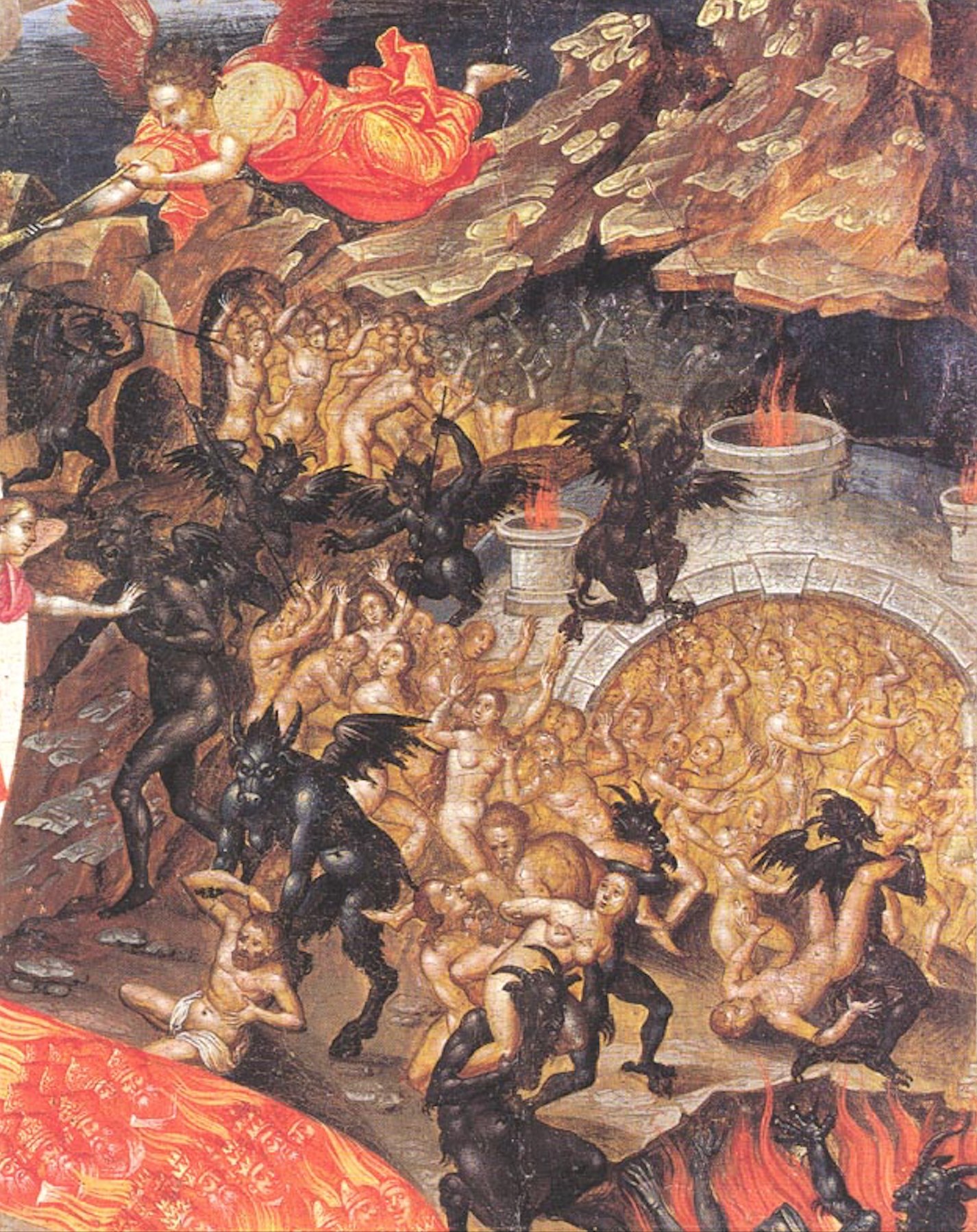
Close Up

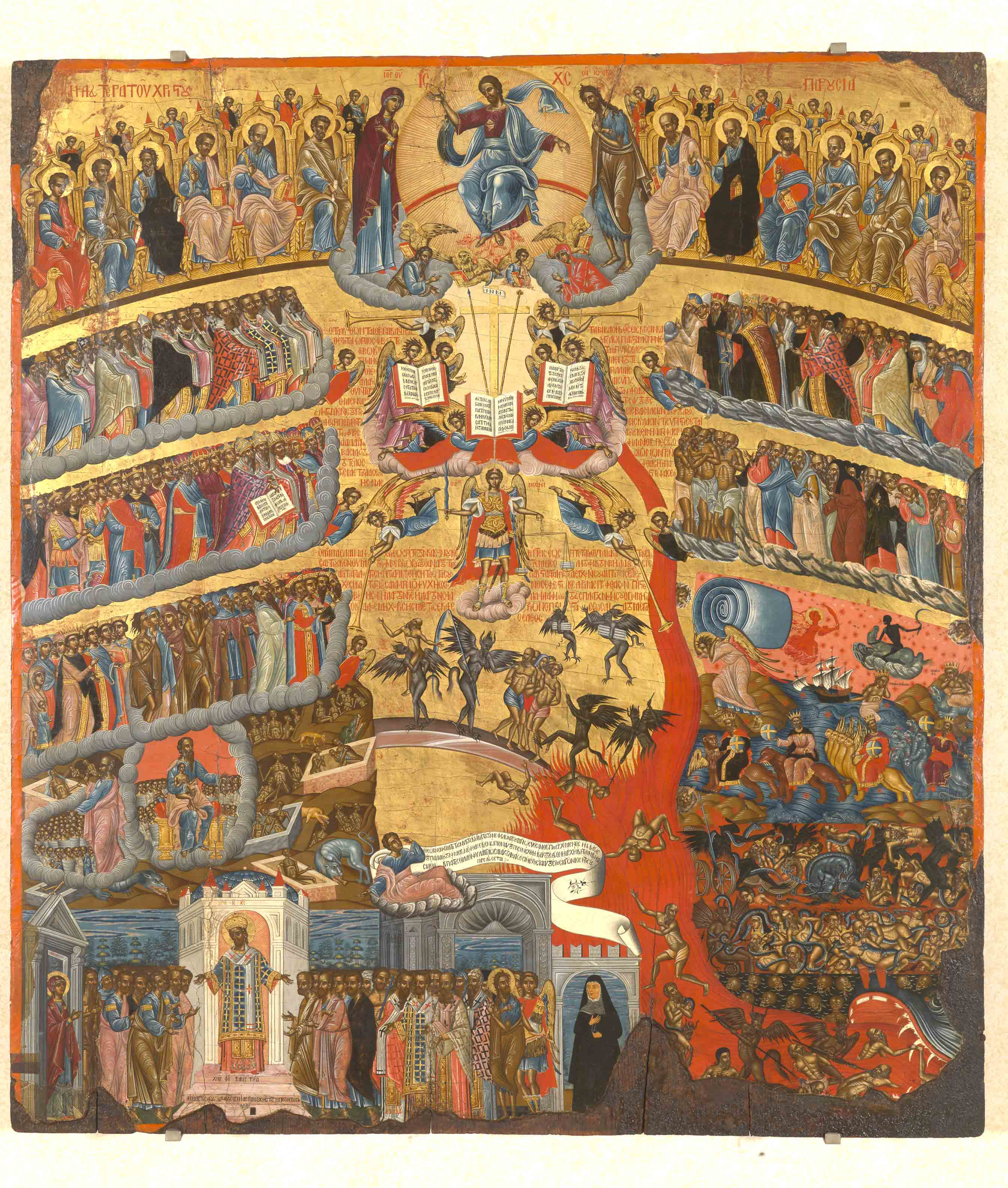
The Last Judgement (Kavertzas)

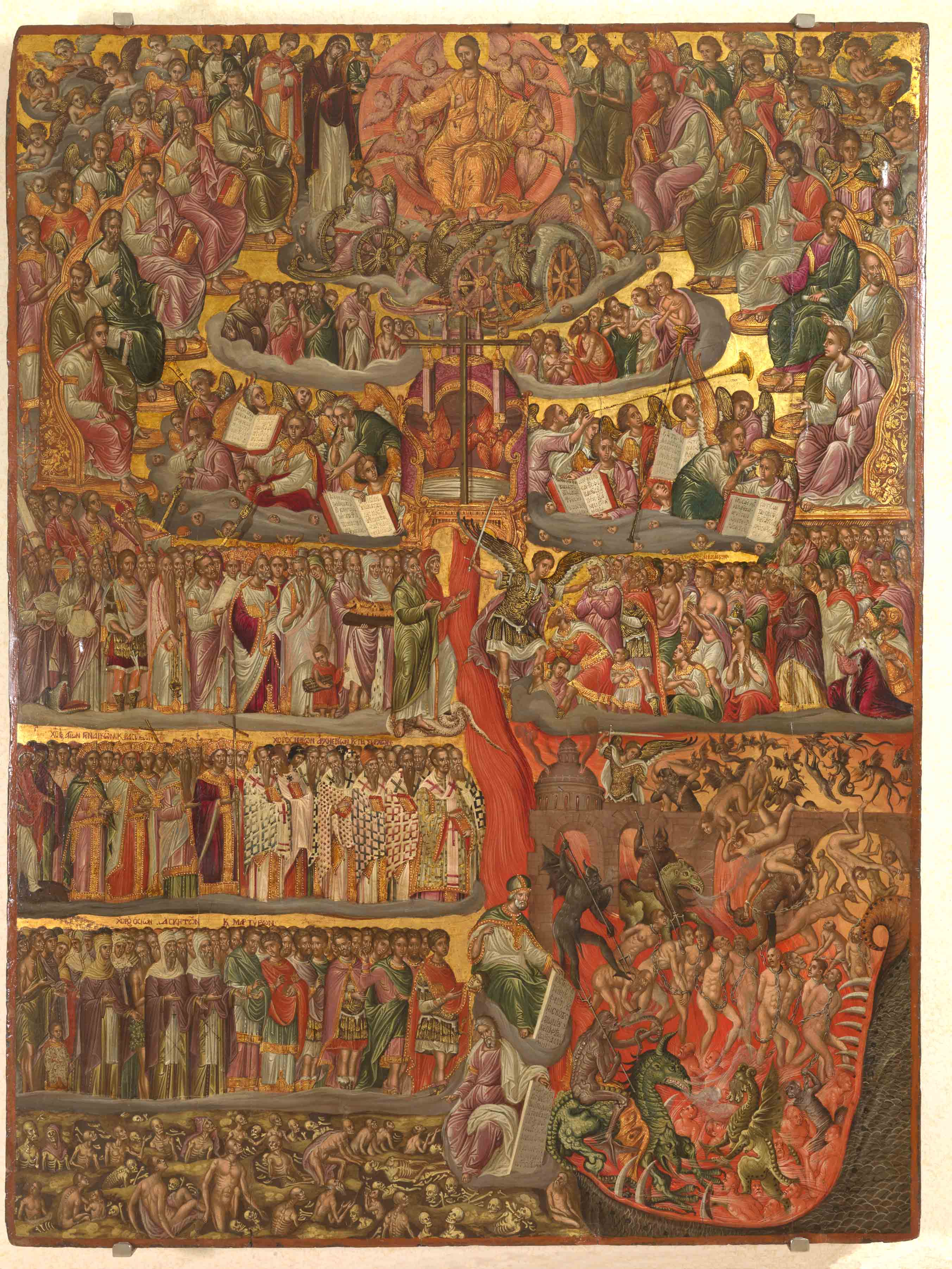
The Last Judgement (Klontzas)
