= The Last Judgment (Klontzas) =

16th-century painting by Georgios Klontzas

The Second Coming
- Δευτέρα Παρουσία (Greek), Il Giudizio Universale (Italian)
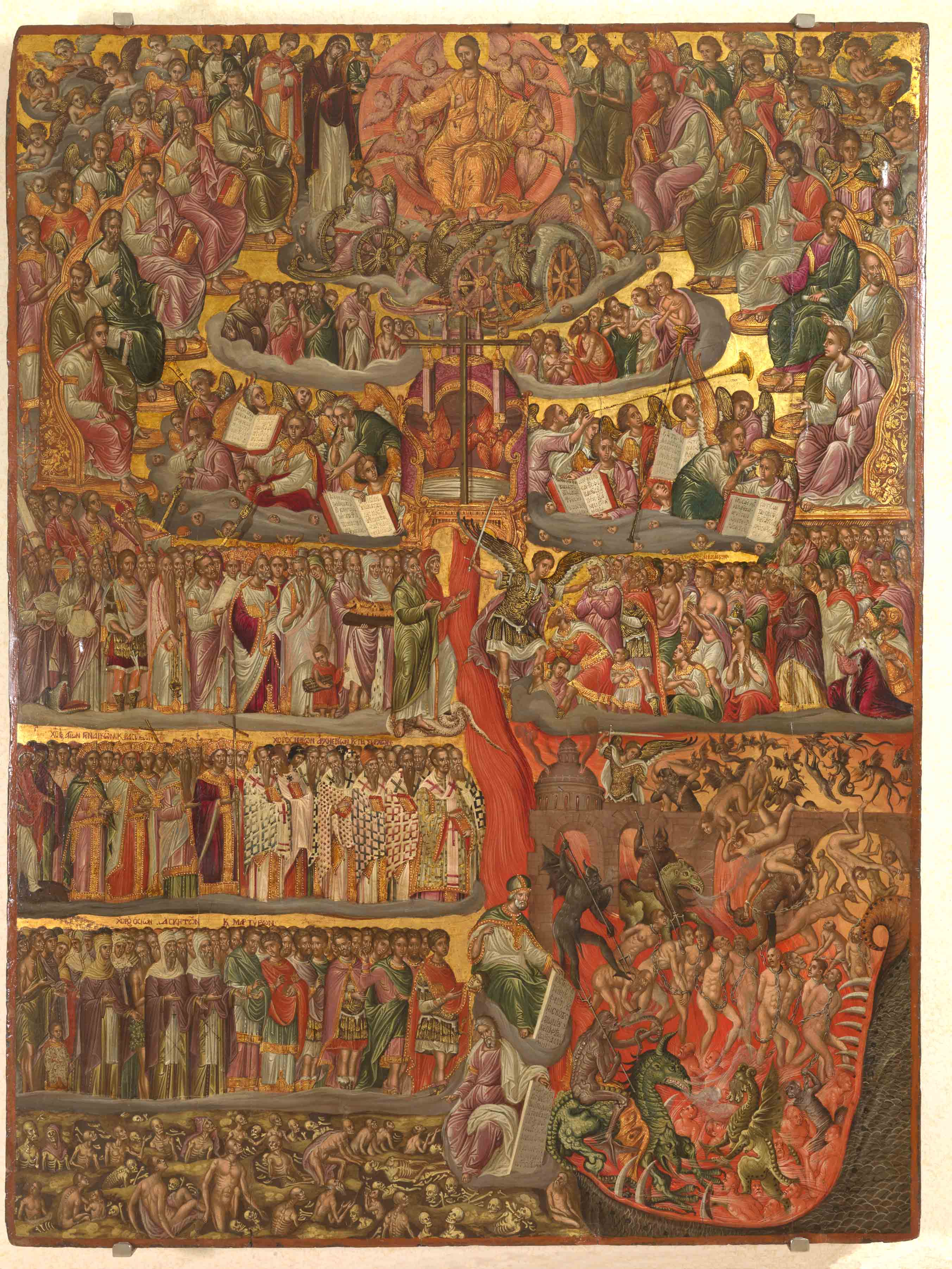
- Artist: Georgios Klontzas
- Year: c. 1580–1608
- Medium: tempera on wood
- Dimensions: 127 cm × 47 cm (50 in × 18.5 in)
- Location: Hellenic Institute of Byzantine and Post-Byzantine Studies, Venice, Italy
- Owner: Hellenic Institute of Byzantine and Post-Byzantine Studies
- Website: eib.xanthi.ilsp.gr/gr/icons.asp (in Greek)

The Last Judgment, otherwise known as The Second Coming, is a late 16th-century Eastern Orthodox icon by Georgios Klontzas. The painting is a depiction of the return of Jesus Christ on the Day of Judgment. In Christianity, the Second Coming of Christ is believed to be the final and infinite judgment by God of the people of every nation, resulting in the salvation for some and the damnation for others. This icon and other works by Klontzas are currently preserved in the Hellenic Institute of Byzantine and Post-Byzantine Studies in Venice, Italy.

Klontzas was a Byzantine Greek artist and émigré from the island of Crete in the period following the end of the Byzantine Empire, and member of the Cretan School. His artistic output was during the second half of the 16th century. He was affiliated with the early works of El Greco and one of the most productive Greek painters of the 16th century, along with Michael Damaskinos Most of his works were copied by other artists. His version of the Second Coming was used as a framework for other artists during the late period of the Cretan School. Leos Moskos and Francheskos Kavertzas both created similar versions.

The Judgment story has been reproduced in art since the inception of Christianity. Both Greek and Italian Byzantine artists used the theme. Notable Italian artist Fra Angelico created many versions of The Last Judgment. Michelangelo also used the theme in the Sistine Chapel. His work there was one of the most important works of the 16th century. Klontzas may have been exposed to the work and other Italian prototypes. Klontzas used the theme multiple times he also has a triptych featuring the Last Judgment. Both The Last Judgement Triptych and this work are preserved in the collection of the Hellenic Institute of Byzantine and Post-Byzantine Studies in Venice, Italy.

== Description ==
The painting is egg tempera and gold leaf on wood panel. The dimensions are 127 cm (36.2 in) × 50 cm (18.5 in), it was completed between 1580 and 1608. Around the vertical axis above the river of fire, which ends in Hell, Jesus Christ appears in his Second Coming on Earth as both the Redeemer and judge before humankind; to his left is John the Baptist, and the Virgin Mary is on his right. The apostles and a multitude of angels are also present. The Day of Judgment has arrived. Under Jesus, there are angels on chariots. There are also symbols of the Four Evangelists and people awaiting the hour of Judgment.

To the right and left of the cross, a musical ensemble appears, and four open books are presented by the artist. The books represent the book of life. Both Michelangelo and Fra Angelico feature similar figures. The musical angels are close to the gateway. Adjacent to the lava is the Archangel Michael with a sword guiding the damned into Purgatory. Under the scene is Hell.

Klontzas features demons and dragons in several of his works. His demons are painted in superlative detail. His dragons are the common green color. His paintings exhibit the 16th-century interpretation of the historic monsters. A large figure, the Jewish prophet Daniel, is sitting on a rock, he holds a tablet facing the sinners. Below Daniel lies another large figure, which is the Israelite priest Ezekiel. He is in the lower portion facing the resurrection of the dead. They hold plaques with inscriptions referring to Hell. To our bottom left, there is a group of figures, the Greek inscription above them reads: "monks and martyrs". They are facing Daniel and Ezekiel. Above them there is another group. Their Greek inscription reads from left to right: "women and kings followed by bishops and patriarchs". The top group below the band to our left features Israelite kings, biblical patriarchs, and other figures from the Old Testament. The patriarch Noah is present, holding the Ark; the patriarch Abraham is standing next to him along with his son Isaac, which holds his sacrifice. The Hebrew prophet Moses is also present, holding the Tablets of Stone. The Jewish prophet Jonah appears with the whale at his feet.

== Gallery ==
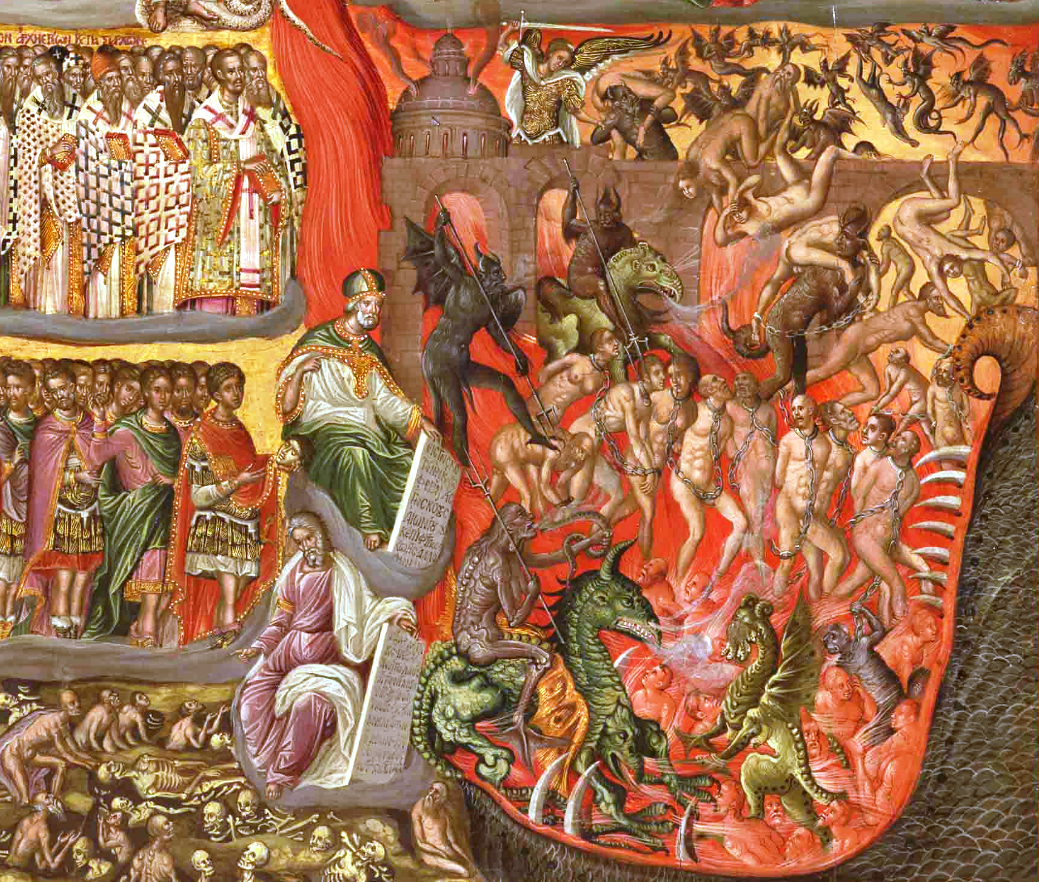
Close up of Hell

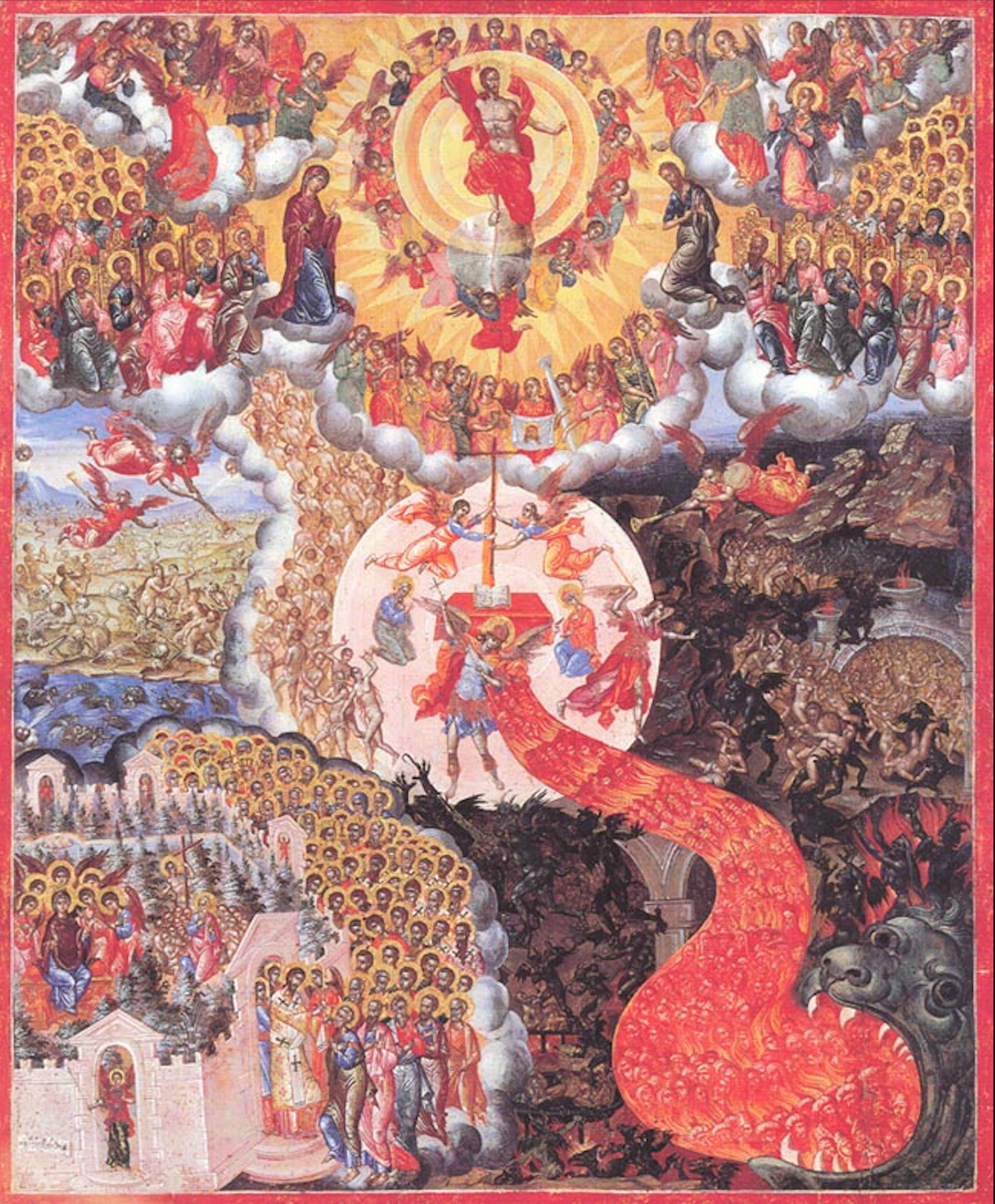
The Last Judgment (Moskos)

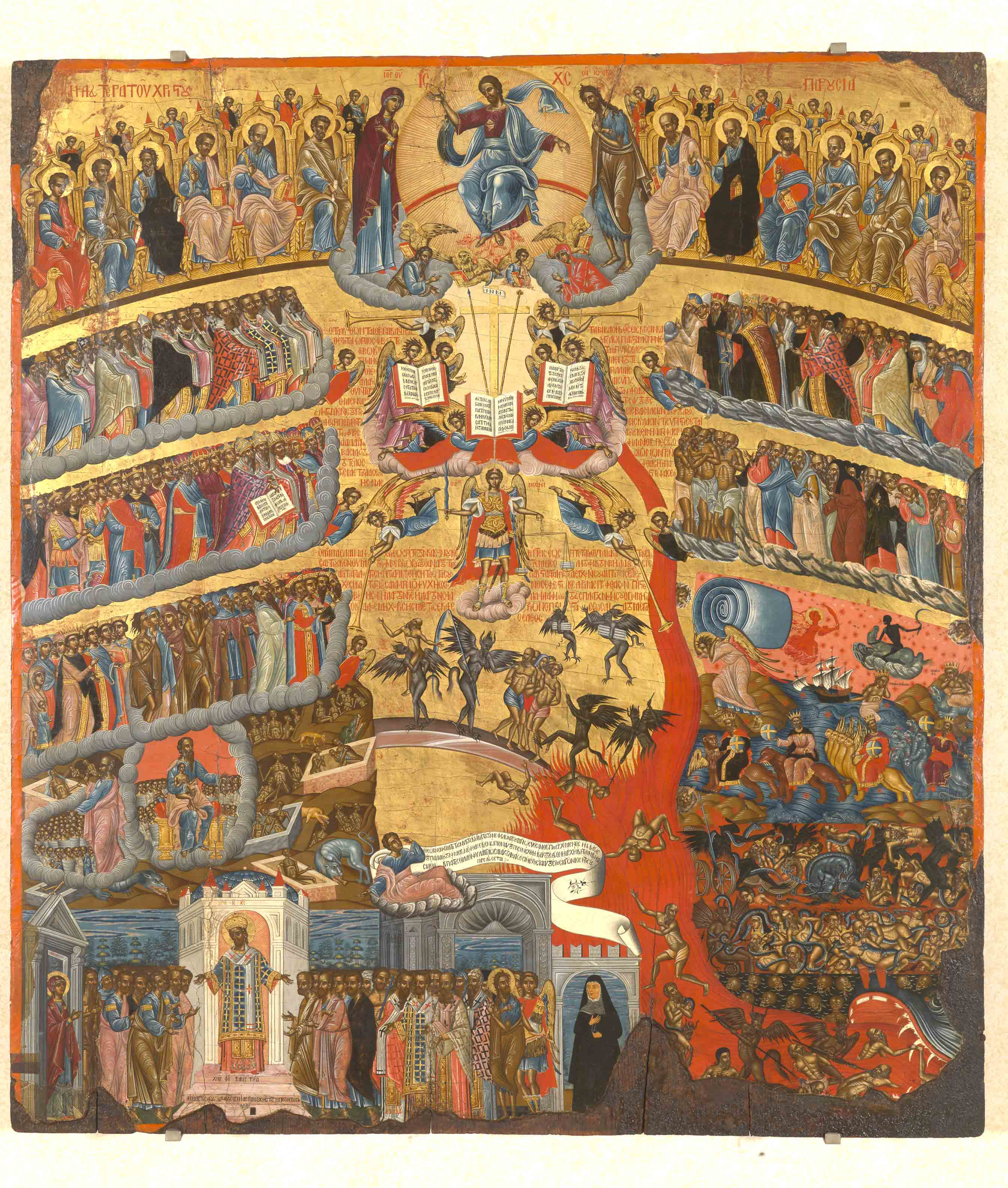
The Last Judgment (Kavertzas)

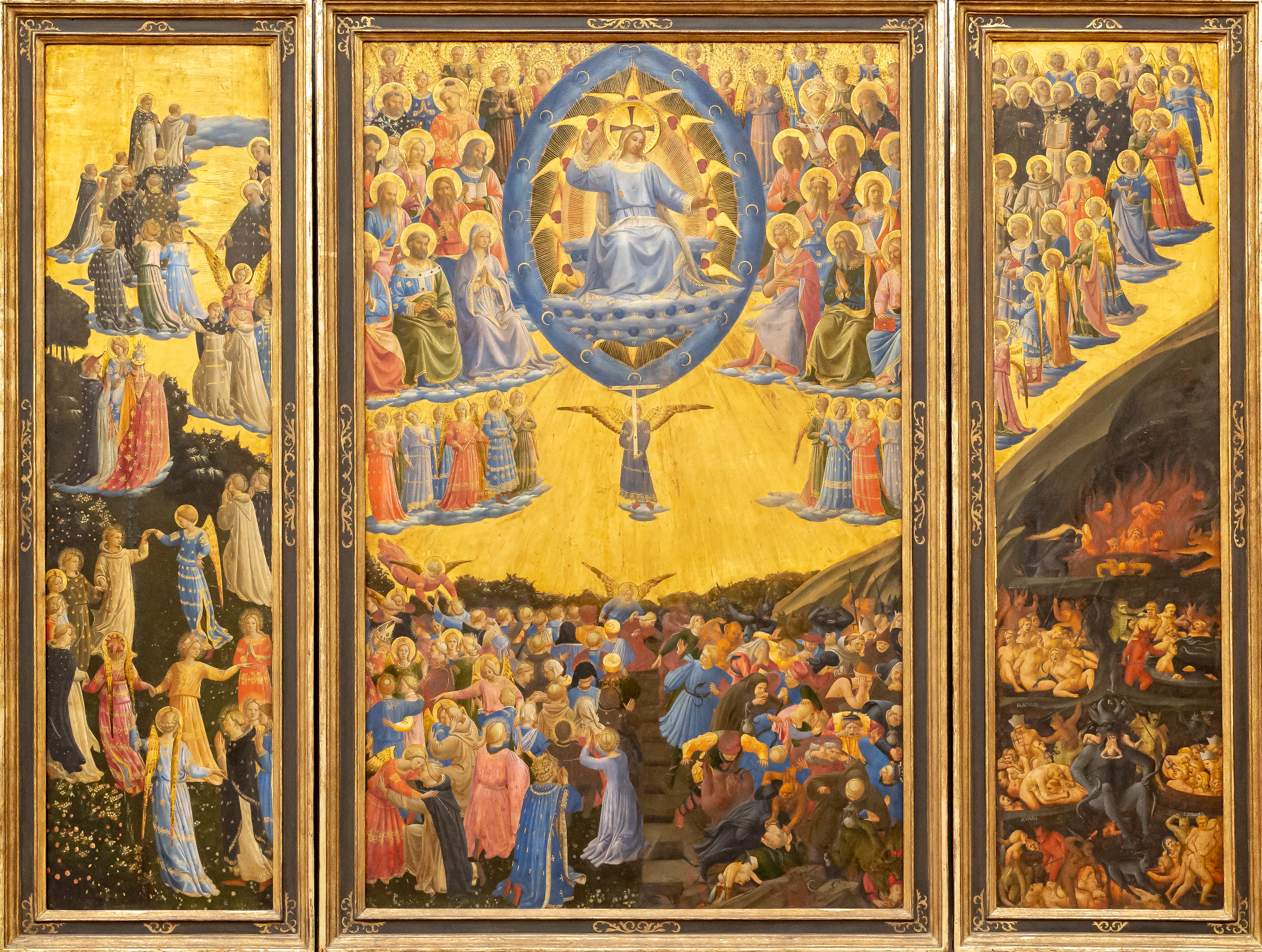
The Last Judgment (Fra Angelico)
