= In You Rejoiceth (Kavertzas) =

Painting by Franghias Kavertzas

All Creation Rejoices in Thee
- Επι Σοι Χαιρει (Greek), En Toi Se Réjouit (French)
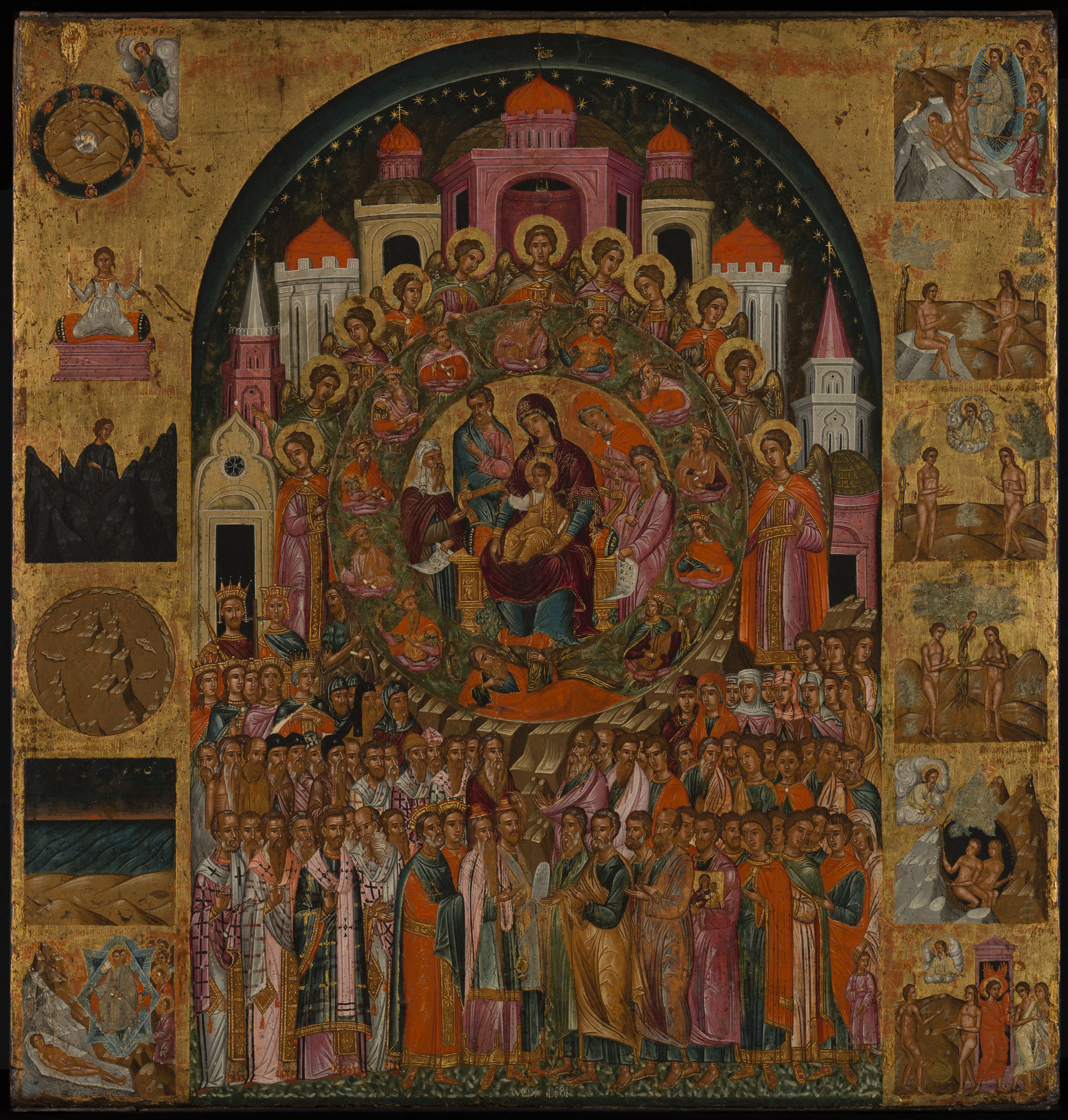
- Artist: Frantzeskos Kavertzas
- Year: c. 1615–1648
- Medium: tempera on wood
- Movement: Late Cretan School
- Subject: In Thee Rejoiceth
- Dimensions: 58 cm × 55 cm (22.8 in × 21.6 in)
- Location: Musée des beaux-arts de la ville de Paris, Paris, France
- Owner: Musée des beaux-arts de la ville de Paris
- Website: Official Website

In You Rejoiceth also known as Epi Si Harri is a tempera and gold leaf painting by Frantzeskos Kavertzas. The painting is a tribute to the Virgin Mary. Kavertzas was active on the island of Crete during the first half of the 17th century. He was a member of the late Cretan School. Seven of his works survived, five were signed. His two most notable pieces are The Last Judgment and In You Rejoiceth. The theme and style behind In You Rejoiceth mostly resembles Georgios Klontzas's painting In Thee Rejoiceth. Theodore Poulakis also created his own version of the masterpiece In Thee Rejoiceth towards the second half of the 17th century. Many artists created their own version of the painting. The theme became a prototype in Crete during the 17th century. Leos Moskos also created his own version of the painting. The Klontzas and Poulakis paintings both feature the Hymn to the Virgin. The Kavertzas painting lacks the pictorial representation of the Hymn to the Virgin. The name is used on paintings that are stylistically similar to Klontzas's original work. Frantzeskos Kavertzas painting is located in Paris at the Musée des beaux-arts de la ville de Paris.

== Description ==
The painting follows the lines of the Italian cangiante style. The materials used to create the masterpiece were egg tempera, gold leaf, and wood panel. The size of the work is 58 cm (22.8 in) x 55 cm (21.6 in ), it was completed in the early part of the 17th century in Heraklion Crete. The work is almost a perfect square. Surrounding the Virgin are 11 crowned figures one of them plays an instrument. There is also a figure immediately at the Virgin's feet. The position of the Madonna and Child is the traditional Our Lady of the Sign also known as Platitera. Eleven angels occupy the otter most circle. Behind the angels in the upper arch are nine buildings. Scenes from Genesis adorn the left and right sides of the icon.

There are twelve scenes. God creates the world in seven days following the Genesis creation narrative. The sunset scene exhibits some impressionist qualities. Adam and Eve are present, the scenes depict their life story. Each frame is painted against a gold background. The painter uses a shadow technique to accentuate his figures. Some of the frames create the illusion of a foreground and a background. The painted figures exhibit some sense of realism. Their facial expressions are clearly defined.

At the bottom of the painting, there is a huge gathering. Their clothing exhibits brilliant striations and folds of fabric. The attire the group is wearing is delicately ornamented with traditional church garb. There is a clear distinction between bright colors, the painter accentuates the cangiante style. The church fathers are present. To our left, standing before the building are two crowned figures, Constantine and Helen. There are more crowned figures beneath them. On the right side of the painting, the Virgin stands next to her mother Anne. Finally in the large crowd, Saint Luke stands out holding an icon of the Virgin and Child.

== Gallery ==
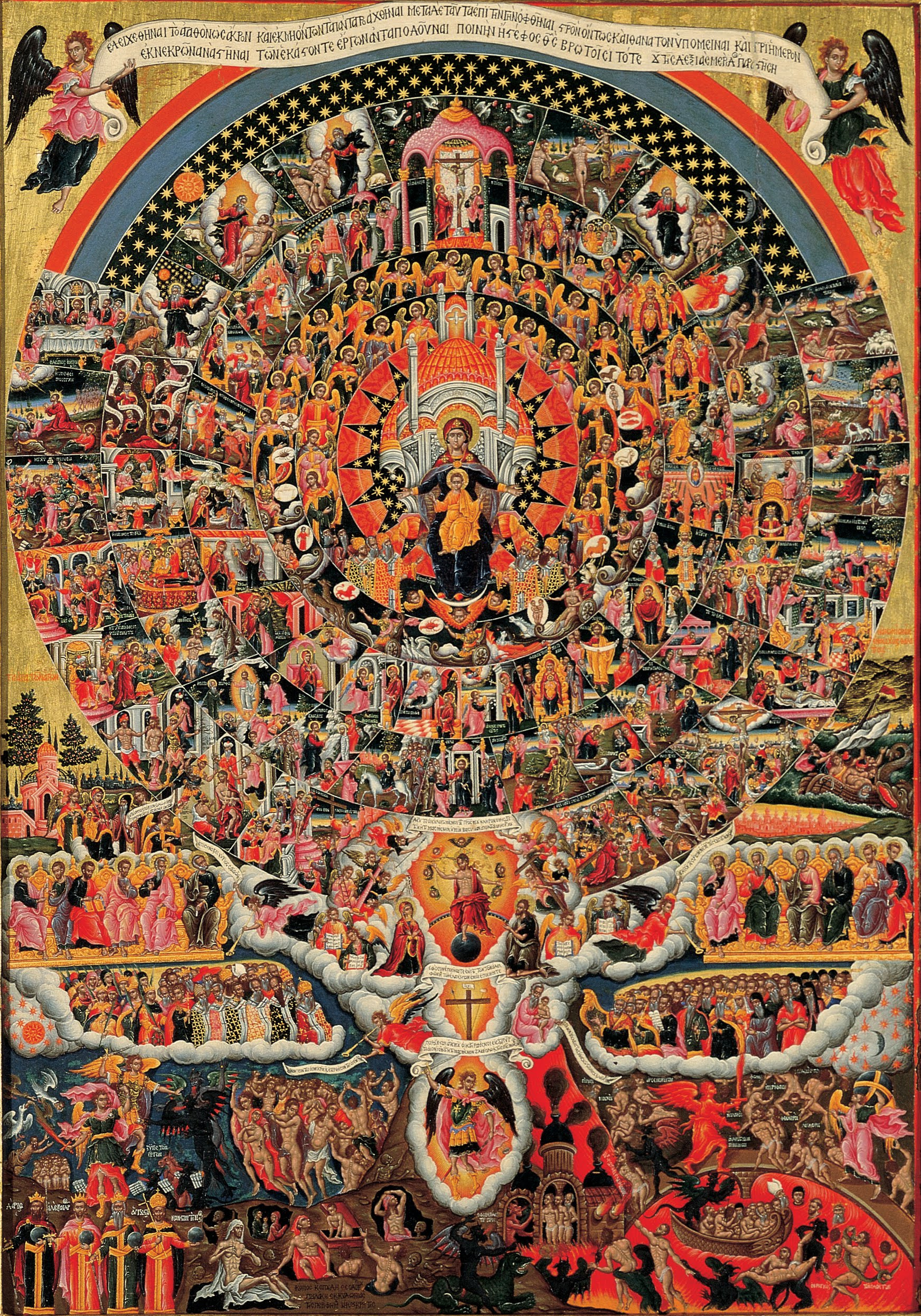
In Thee Rejoiceth

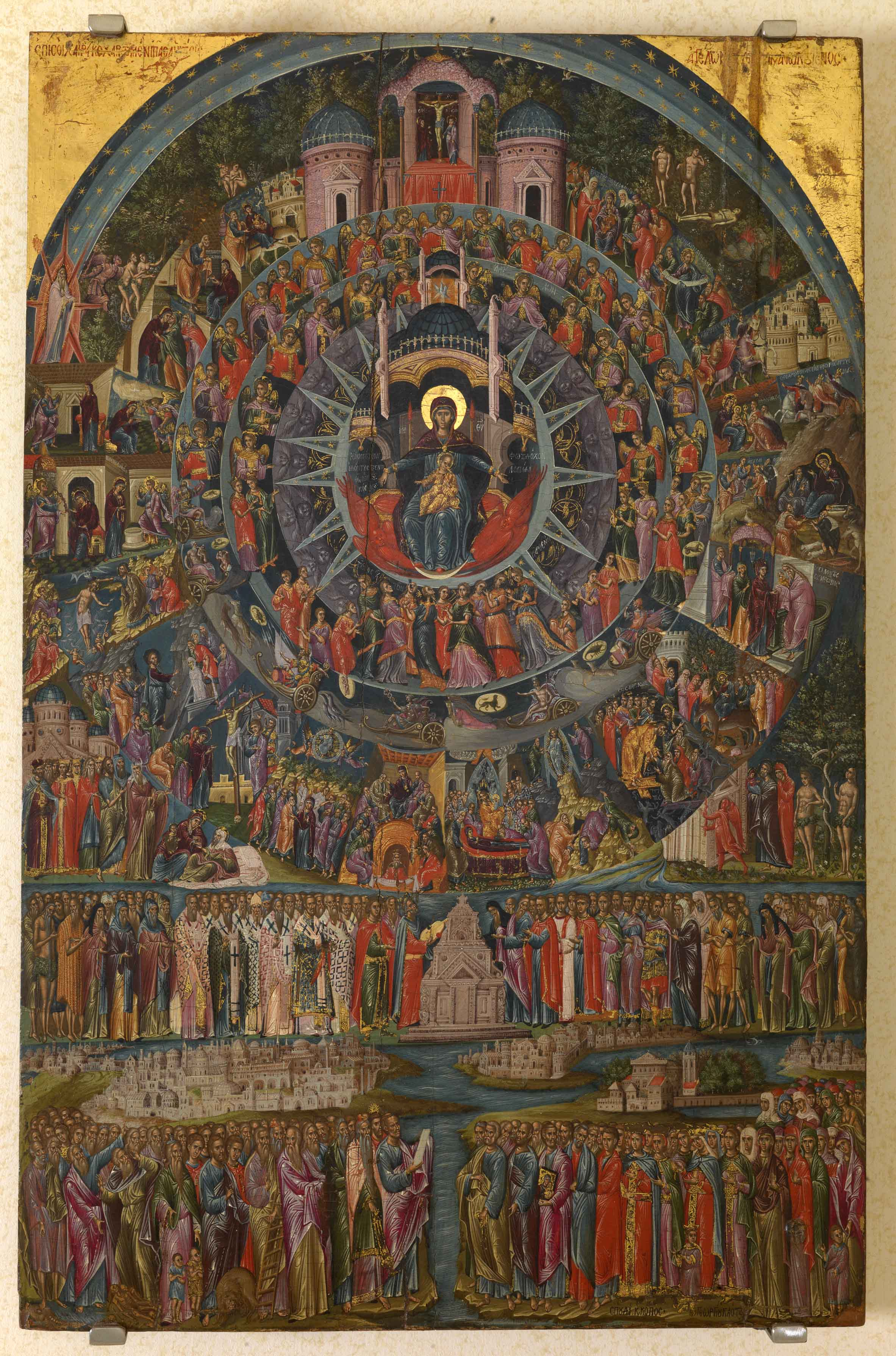
In Thee Rejoiceth

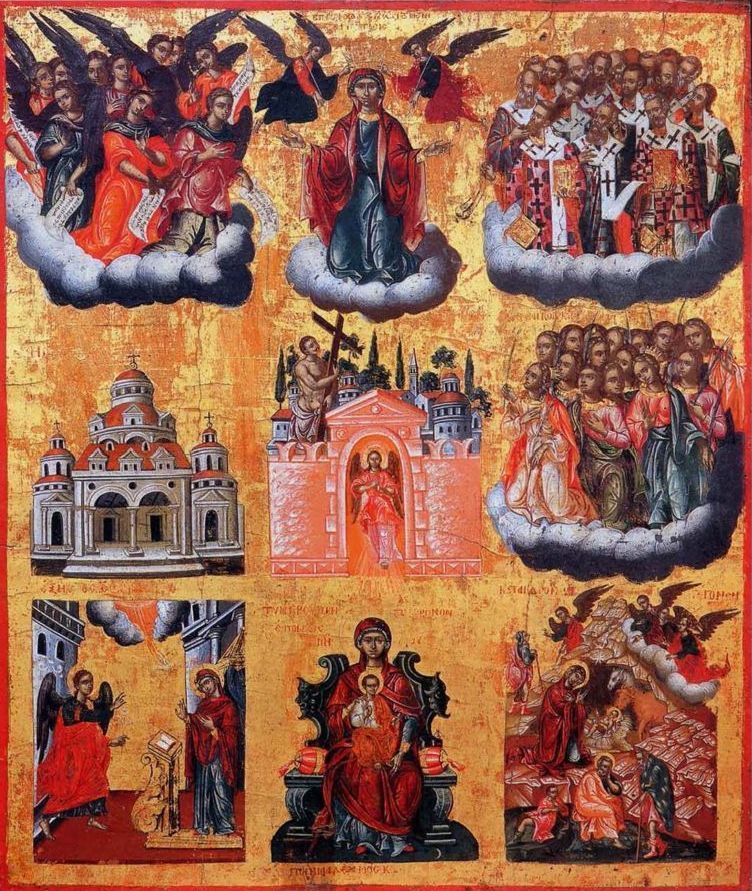
In Thee Rejoiceth (Moskos)
