= In Thee Rejoiceth =

In Thee Rejoiceth may refer to:

- In Thee Rejoiceth (Klontzas), a painting by Georgios Klontzas
- In Thee Rejoiceth (Poulakis), a painting by Theodore Poulakis
