= In Thee Rejoiceth (Klontzas) =

Painting by Georgios Klontzas

All Creation Rejoices in Thee
- Επι Σοι Χαιρει (Greek), In Te Si Rallegra Tutta la Creazione (Italian)
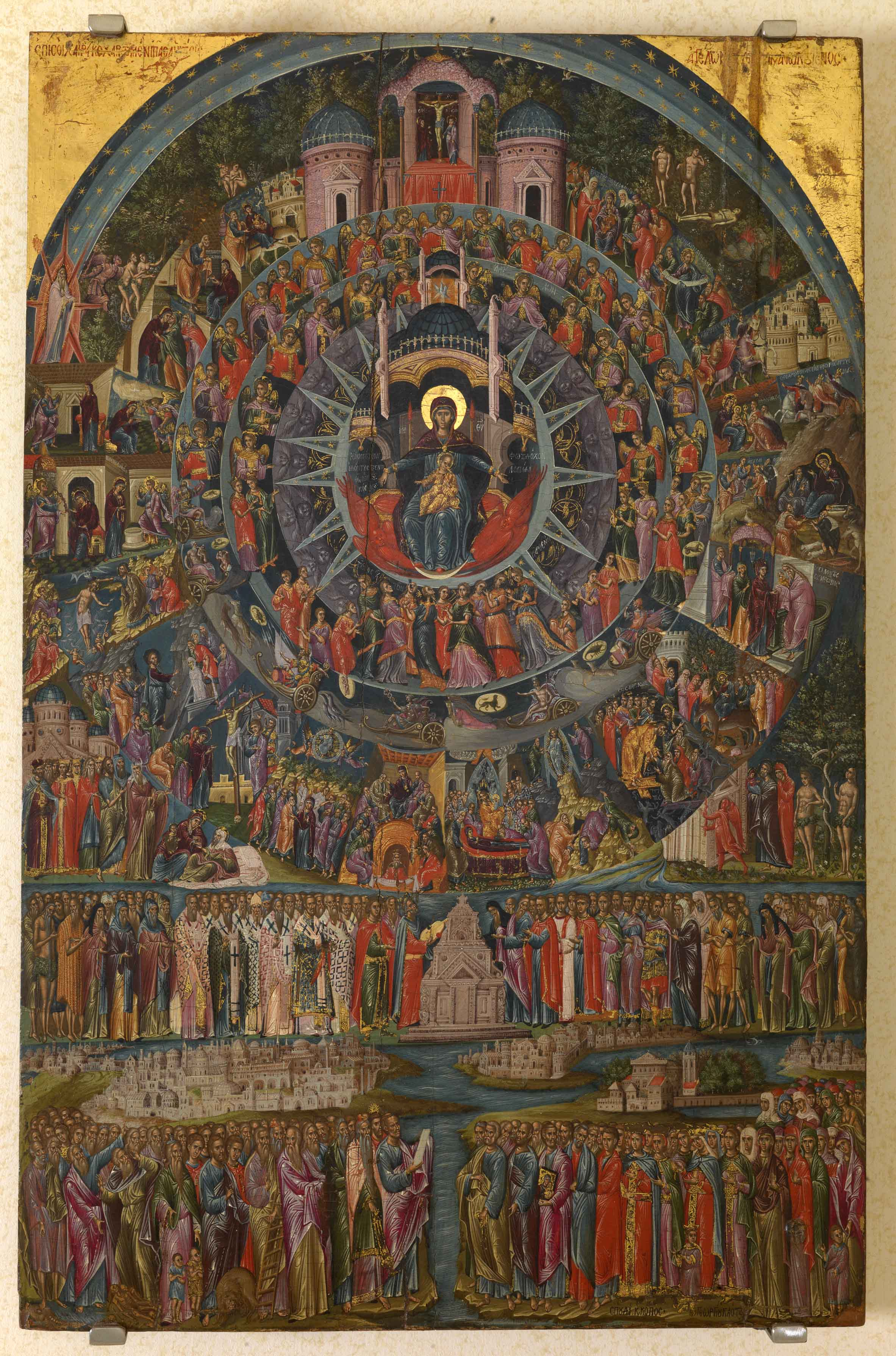
- Artist: Georgios Klontzas
- Year: c. 1560-1608
- Medium: tempera on wood
- Movement: Cretan School
- Subject: In Thee Rejoiceth
- Dimensions: 71.5 cm × 47 cm (28.2 in × 18.5 in)
- Location: Hellenic Institute of Byzantine and Post-Byzantine Studies, Venice
- Owner: Hellenic Institute of Byzantine and Post-Byzantine Studies

In Thee Rejoiceth also known as Epi Si Harri is a tempera and gold leaf painting by Georgios Klontzas. The painting is a tribute to the Virgin Mary. Klontzas was active on the island of Crete during the second half of the 16th century. He was a member of the Cretan School. He was one of the most prolific Greek painters of the 16th century. Most of his works were copied by other artists. The In Thee Rejoiceth painting was copied by countless Greek and Italian painters. Theodore Poulakis created a version in the 17 century that is very similar to Klontzas's In Thee Rejoiceth. Franghias Kavertzas also painted a similar theme. He called his painting In You Rejoices. Leos Moskos also created his version of the popular painting. The Klontzas painting is currently at the Hellenic Institute of Byzantine and Post-Byzantine Studies Museum in Venice.

== Hymn ==
Klontzas was inspired by the hymn that was composed by the Syrian monk John of Damascus. It was used in the Divine Liturgy of Saint Basil the Great during the Liturgy of the Faithful. The hymn is as follows:

Ἐπὶ σοὶ χαίρει, Κεχαριτωμένη, πᾶσα ἡ
κτίσις, Ἀγγέλων τὸ σύστημα, καὶ ἀνθρώπων τὸ
γένος, ἡγιασμένε ναέ, καὶ Παράδεισε λογικέ,
παρθενικὸν καύχημα· ἐξ ἧς Θεὸς ἐσαρκώθη,
καὶ παιδίον γέγονεν, ὁ πρὸ αἰώνων ὑπάρχων
Θεὸς ἡμῶν. Τὴν γὰρ σὴν μήτραν, θρόνον
ἐποίησε, καὶ τὴν σὴν γαστέρα, πλατυτέραν
οὐρανῶν ἀπειργάσατο. Ἐπὶ σοὶ χαίρει,
Κεχαριτωμένη, πᾶσα ἡ κτίσις· δόξα σοι.

All of Creation rejoices in thee, O full of grace
the angels in heaven and the race of men,
O sanctified temple and spiritual paradise,
the glory of virgins, of whom God was incarnate
and became a child, our God before the ages.
He made thy body into a throne,
and thy womb more spacious than the heavens.
All of creation rejoices in thee, O full of grace
Glory be to thee.

== Description ==
The painting is egg tempera and gold leaf on wood. The dimensions are 71.5 cm x 47 cm or 28.2 in x 18.5 in, it was completed in the latter part of the 16th century in Heraklion Crete. The painting follows the traditional maniera greca. The work was influenced by the Venetian style. The Virgin is the central figure in the icon. She is holding Christ while sitting on a throne, she is surrounded by several Seraphim. They are located on an outer circular layer. The Virgin and child are inside of a church archway. A holy dove is above the Virgin. She is surrounded by hierarchal concentric circles. The highest-ranking angels are closest to the Virgin. As the circles travel further from the Virgin the Cherubs and other angels follow. Even further from the center are new and old testament narratives.

At the top of the painting is the crucifixion, there is a second crucifixion to our lower left. A figure of God is to our left in the upper portion of the upper archway. The figure is next to Adam and Eve. The two biblical figures occupy a wilderness on the upper archway transversing the archway from left to right. Immediately below the figure of God the Virgin partakes in the Annunciation. She interacts with the angel for four scenes. There is a detailed visual story of her life. She explains the blessing to her family, then to Joseph. The left narrative ends with Joseph and her traveling on a donkey. On the right side, the Virgin is seated with Jesus for a second time. In a Virgin and child sequence.

The painting is also full of hidden meanings and symbols. There are zodiac symbols. The painting features the Dodekaorton and the houses of Akathistos. The painting exhibits elaborate buildings giving viewers a perspective of 16th-century architecture. At the bottom, is a lagoon reminiscent of Venice, Upper Jerusalem is depicted, as well as saints, who are lined up in dense hierarchical groups. The entire universe praises Mary for her role in Jesus's work. The Greek Inscription reads ΕΠΙ CΟΙ ΧΑΙΡΕΙ ΚΕΧΑΡΙΤΩΜΕΝΗ ΠΑCΑ Η KTICIC, ΑΓΓΕΛΩΝ ΤΟ CΥCTHMA KAI ANΘΡΩΠΩΝ ΤΟ ΓΕΝΟC (Happy and Blessed is Creation, Angles, the Universe and the Genesis of Man.. His signature was ΣΠΟΥΔΙ Κ[ΑΙ] ΚΟΠΟΣ, ΤΟΥ ΓΕΩΡΓΙΟΥ ΚΛΟΤΖΑ (Tireless Labor and Study of Georgios Klontzas)

== Gallery ==
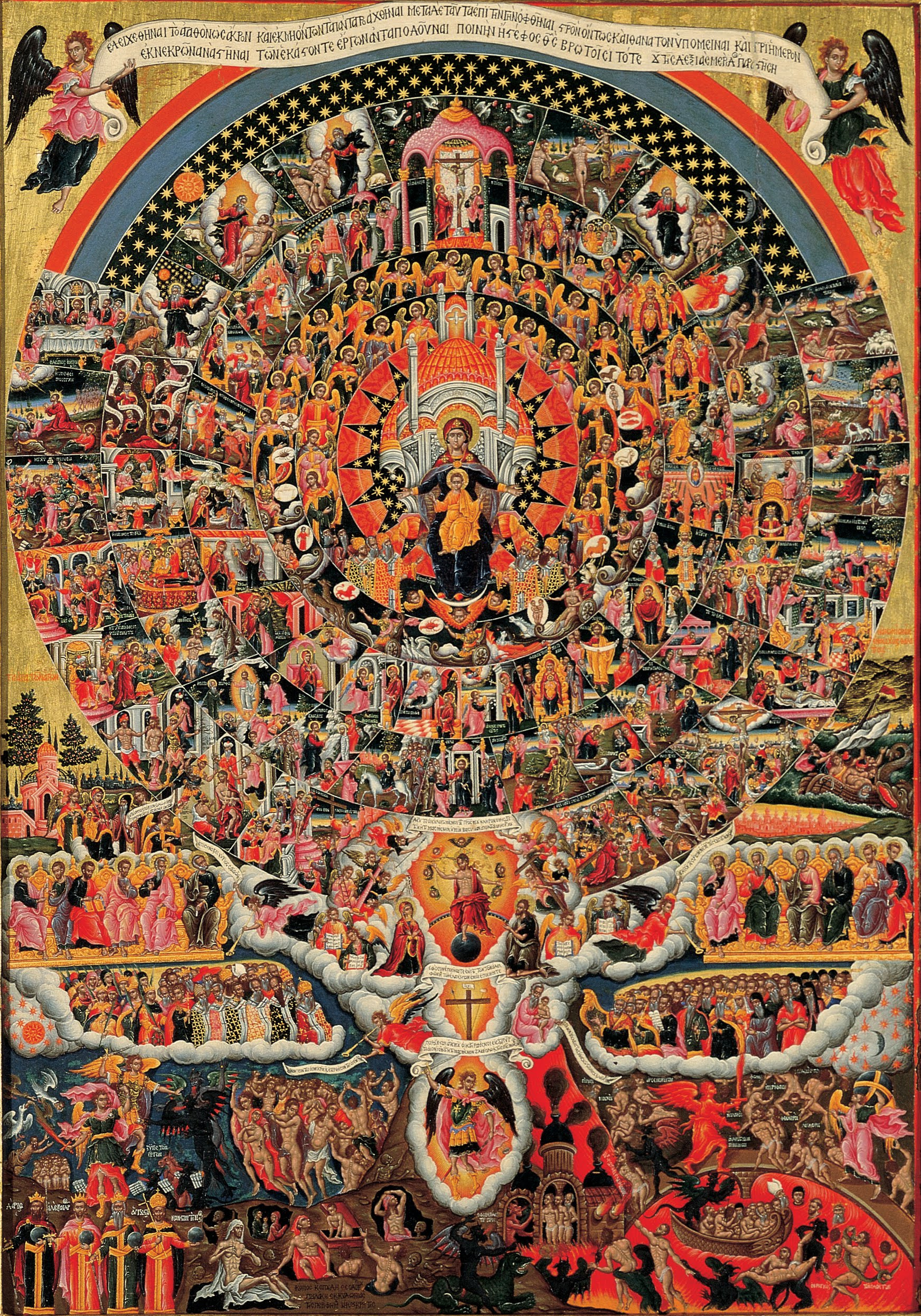
In Thee Rejoiceth

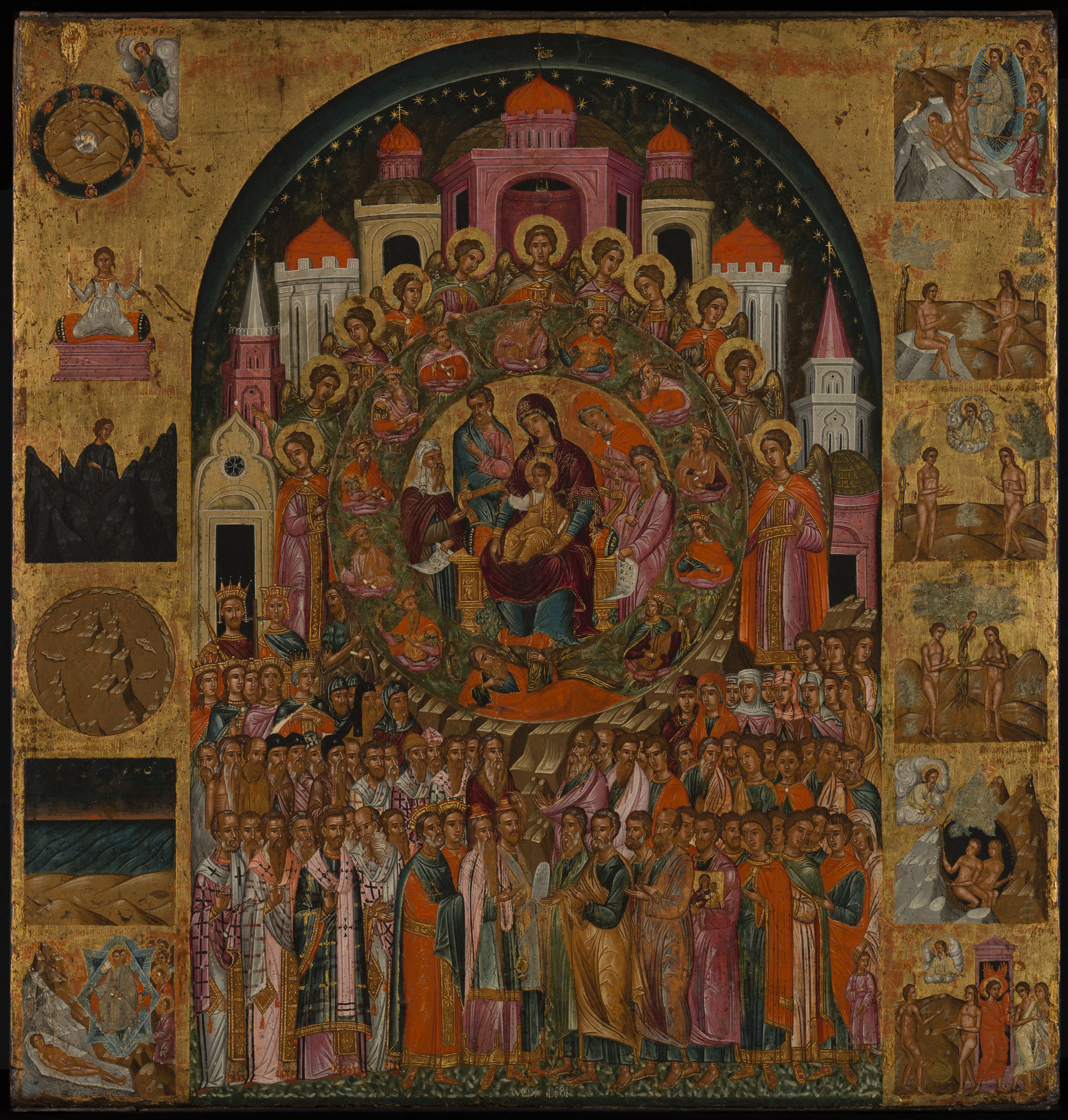
In You Rejoiceth

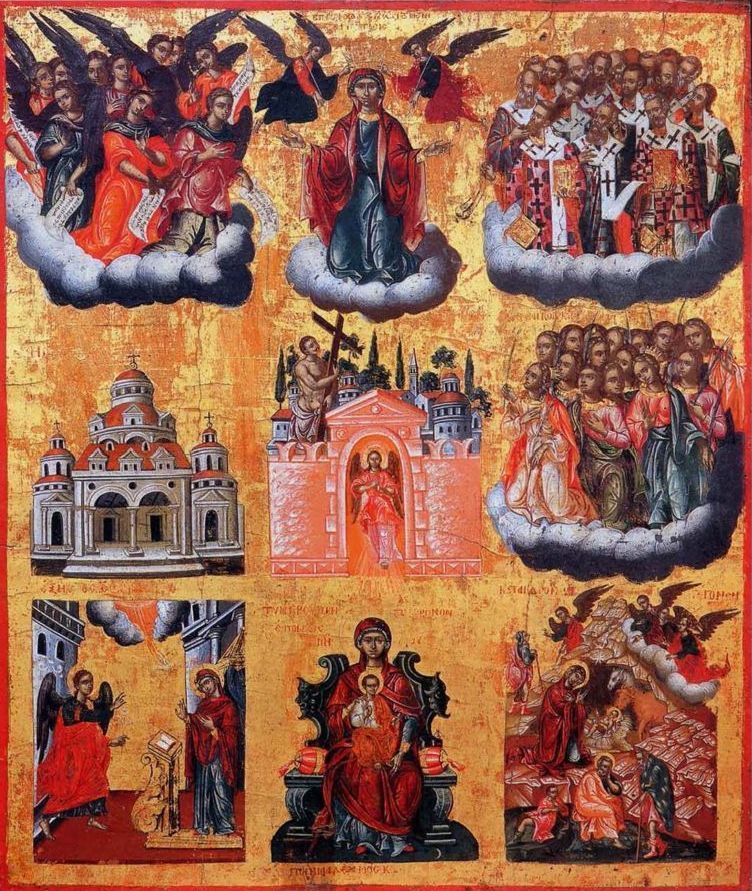
In Thee Rejoiceth (Moskos)
