= Franghias Kavertzas =

Greek painter (1590/1600–1648)

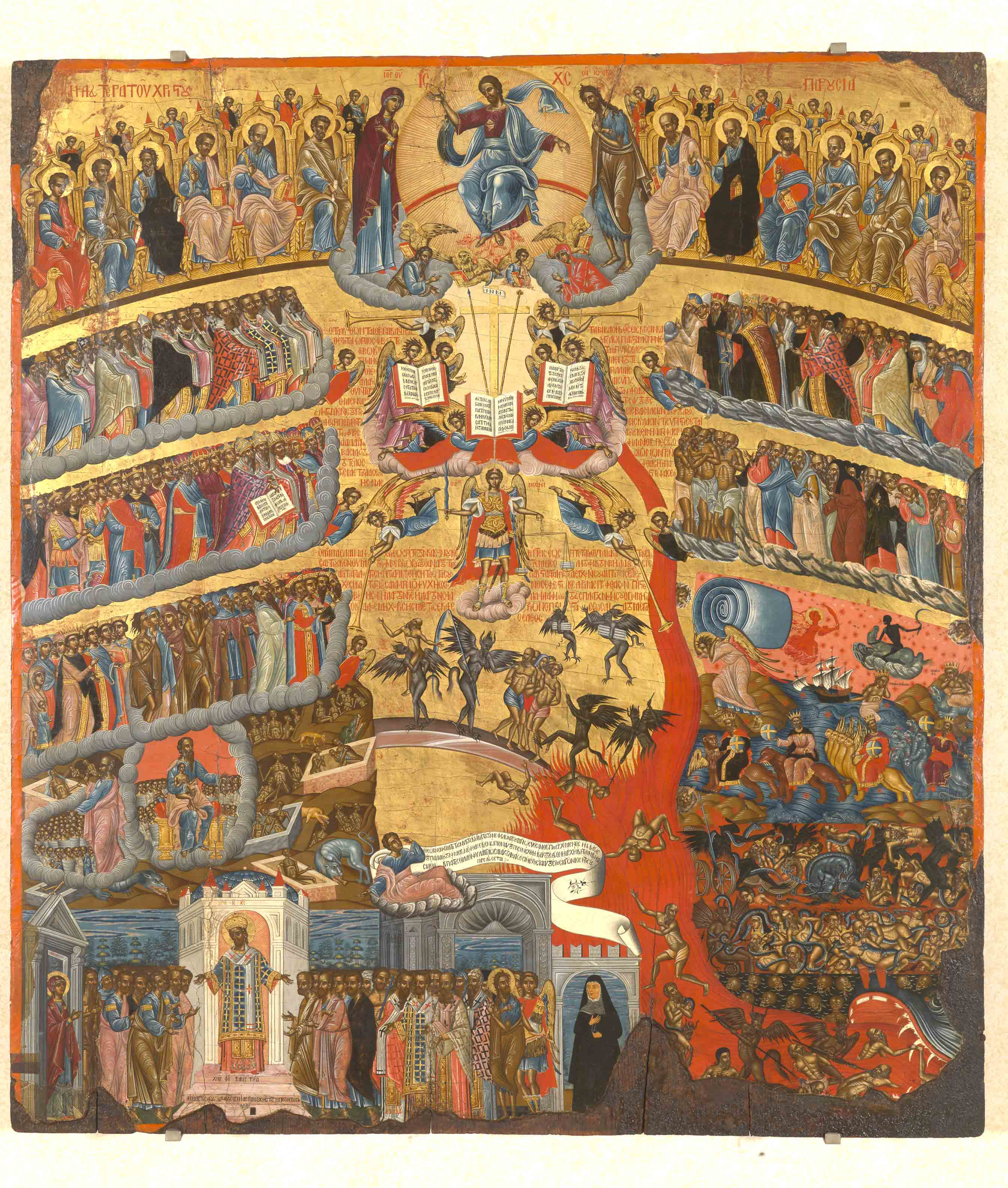
- Last Judgement
- Born: 1590/1600; Heraklion, Republic of Venice
- Died: 1648; Heraklion, Republic of Venice
- Known for: Iconography and hagiography
- Notable work: Last Judgement
- Movement: Cretan school

Frantzeskos or Franghias Kavertzas (Greek: Φραντζέσκος Καβερτζάς; 1590/1600–1648) was a Greek painter. His painting style resembles the late Cretan school or early Greek Baroque period. His work was influenced by Georgios Klontzas, Michael Damaskinos and Emmanuel Tzanfournaris. He was active in Crete during the early part of the 17th century, roughly after the death of Georgios Klontzas. He painted two icons that are very similar to Klontzas's most notable pieces. Theodore Poulakis also painted similar themes. Kavertzas' artwork incorporates the Venetian school. His works also influenced Leos Moskos. His most notable works are the Last Judgement, In You Rejoiceth.

== History ==
Kavertzas was born in Heraklion. His father's name was Pavlos. He married Manea Sophianou's sister. Kavertzas had three sons. His first son Pavlos was a painter. There are some records with his signature between 1615 and 1647. He owned property in Crete and Italy. On March 9, 1641, a nun named Evgenia Trapezontiopoulla owed him money for his Last Judgement painting; he could not pay him in money. She bartered with Kavertzas instead. A nun also appears in the lower portion of the Last Judgement painting. Kavertzas had an active and very successful workshop in Crete during the early part of the 17th century before it fell to the Ottomans.

Kavertzas belonged to the late Cretan school. His art was influenced by Georgios Klontzas and Michael Damaskinos. He influenced the art of Leos Moskos and his Last Judgment painting. Other artists active in Crete around this time were Emmanuel Tzanes, Philotheos Skoufos, and Ieremias Palladas. He painted icons for churches and private collections. His patrons were both Italian and Greek.

== All Creation Rejoices In Thee ==
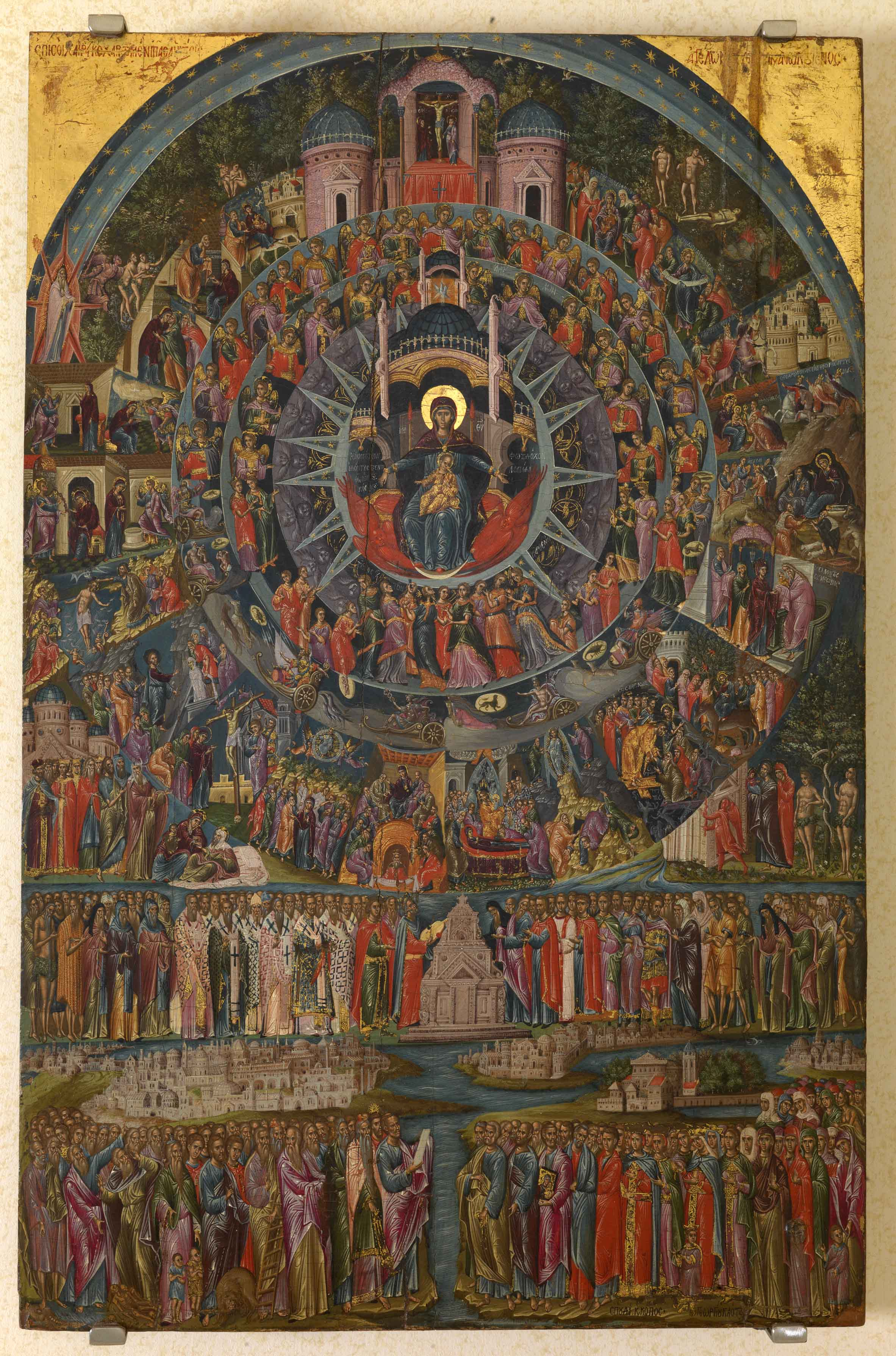
All Creation rejoices in thee, Georgios Klontzas

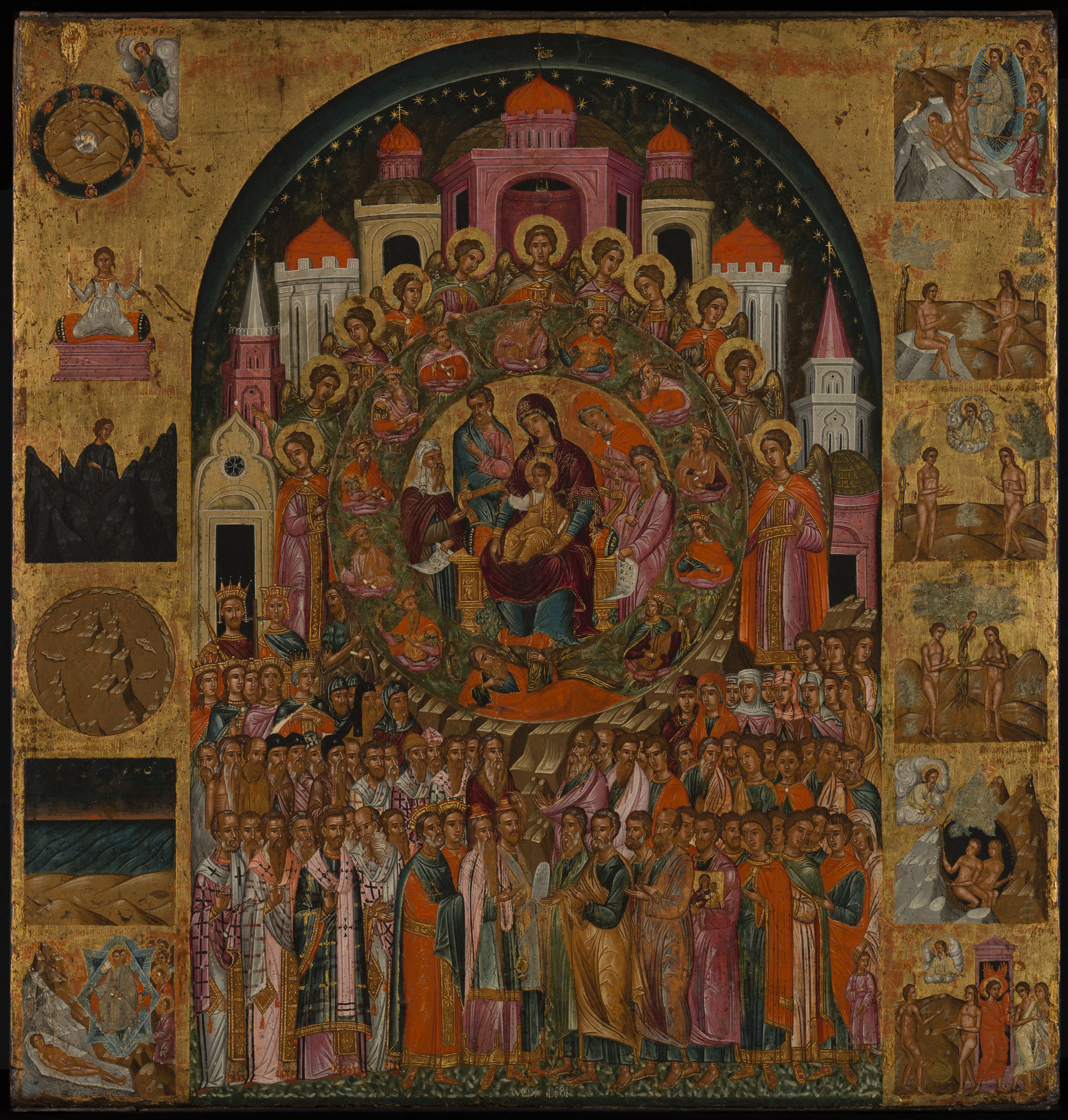
In You rejoices, Franghias Kavertzas

Kavertzas icon hymn In You rejoices was inspired by Klontzas and the hymn that was composed by the Syrian monk John of Damascus. It was used in the Divine Liturgy of Saint Basil the Great during the Liturgy of the Faithful. The hymn is as follows:

All of Creation rejoices in thee, O full of grace
the angels in heaven and the race of men,
O sanctified temple and spiritual paradise,
the glory of virgins, of whom God was incarnate
and became a child, our God before the ages.
He made thy body into a throne,
and thy womb more spacious than the heavens.
All of creation rejoices in thee, O full of grace
Glory be to thee.

Both Kavertzas and Theodore Poulakis's paintings were influenced by Georgios Klontzas Kavertzas does not include the pictural representation of the Hymn to the Virgin but is often referred to as the Hymn to the Virgin due to its similarity to both Poulakis and Klontzas work. The theme became extremely popular and desirable among patrons. Theodore Poulakis's version is similar to Klontzas's In Thee Rejoiceth while Kavertzas painting bears similarities but it exhibits its own characteristics. Kavertzas has fewer figures and the narratives are more apparent. However, Kavertzas' grouping of the figures at the bottom clearly resembles Georgios Klontzas. he circles of themes also flow outwards.

== See also ==
- Greek scholars in the Renaissance
- Andreas Karantinos

== Bibliography ==
- Hatzidakis, Manolis; Drakopoulou, Evgenia (1997). Έλληνες Ζωγράφοι μετά την Άλωση (1450-1830). Τόμος 2: Καβαλλάρος - Ψαθόπουλος [Greek Painters after the Fall of Constantinople (1450-1830). Volume 2: Kavallaros - Psathopoulos]. Athens: Center for Modern Greek Studies, National Research Foundation. ISBN 960-7916-00-X.
