= Hellenic Institute of Byzantine and Post-Byzantine Studies in Venice =

Research center in Venice, Italy

Coordinates: 45.4357°N 12.3446°E

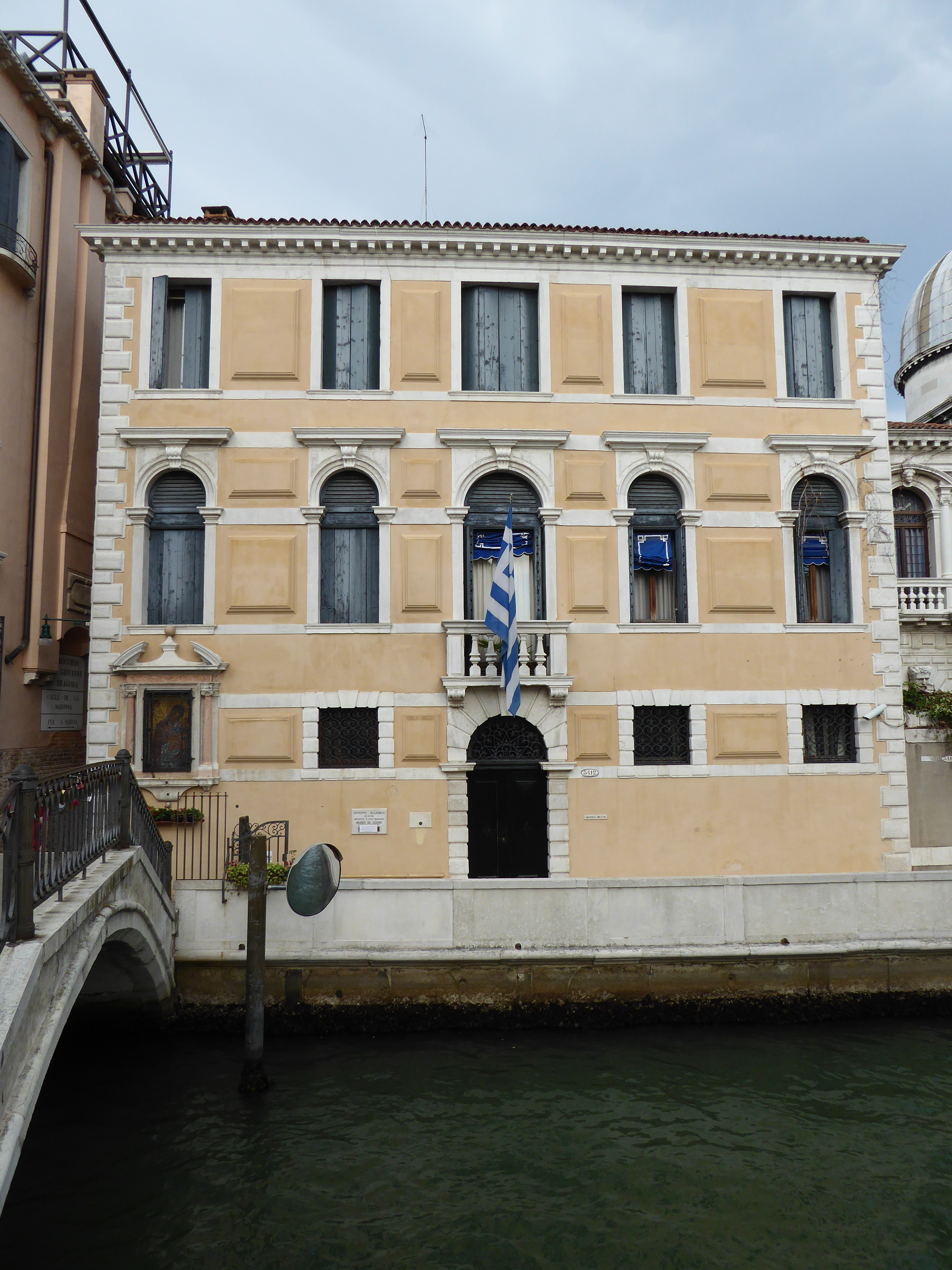
Building of the Institute

The Hellenic Institute of Byzantine and Post-Byzantine Studies in Venice (Italian: Istituto Ellenico di Studi Bizantini e Postbizantini di Venezia, Greek: Ελληνικό Ινστιτούτο Βυζαντινών και Μεταβυζαντινών Σπουδών στη Βενετία) is a research centre owned and funded by the Greek state in Venice, Italy, focusing on Byzantine and Post-Byzantine/Modern Greek studies. It is the only Greek research institute abroad.

The institute was founded in 1951, and operates under the auspices of the Greek Ministry of Foreign Affairs, with its educational activity coordinated by the Greek Ministry of Education. The Institute owns several buildings associated with the formerly vibrant Greek community of Venice, most notably the church of San Giorgio dei Greci and the Flanginian School. It also operates its own museum and archive, which house a collection of 300 icons and numerous manuscripts, most notably a copy of the Romance of Alexander the Great.

== Publications ==
- Θησαυρίσματα: του Ελληνικού Ινστιτούτου Βυζαντινών και Μεταβυζαντινών Σπουδών

== See also ==
- Hellenic Institute of Byzantine and Post-Byzantine Catalog of Paintings

== Bibliography ==
- Tselenti-Papadopoulou, Niki G. (2002). Οι Εικονες της Ελληνικης Αδελφοτητας της Βενετιας απο το 16ο εως το Πρωτο Μισο του 20ου Αιωνα: Αρχειακη Τεκμηριωση [The Icons of the Greek Brotherhood of Venice from 1600 to First Half of the 20th Century]. Athens: Ministry of Culture Publication of the Archaeological Bulletin No. 81. ISBN 960-214-221-9.
