= Leos Moskos =

Greek painter and educator (1620/30 – 1690)

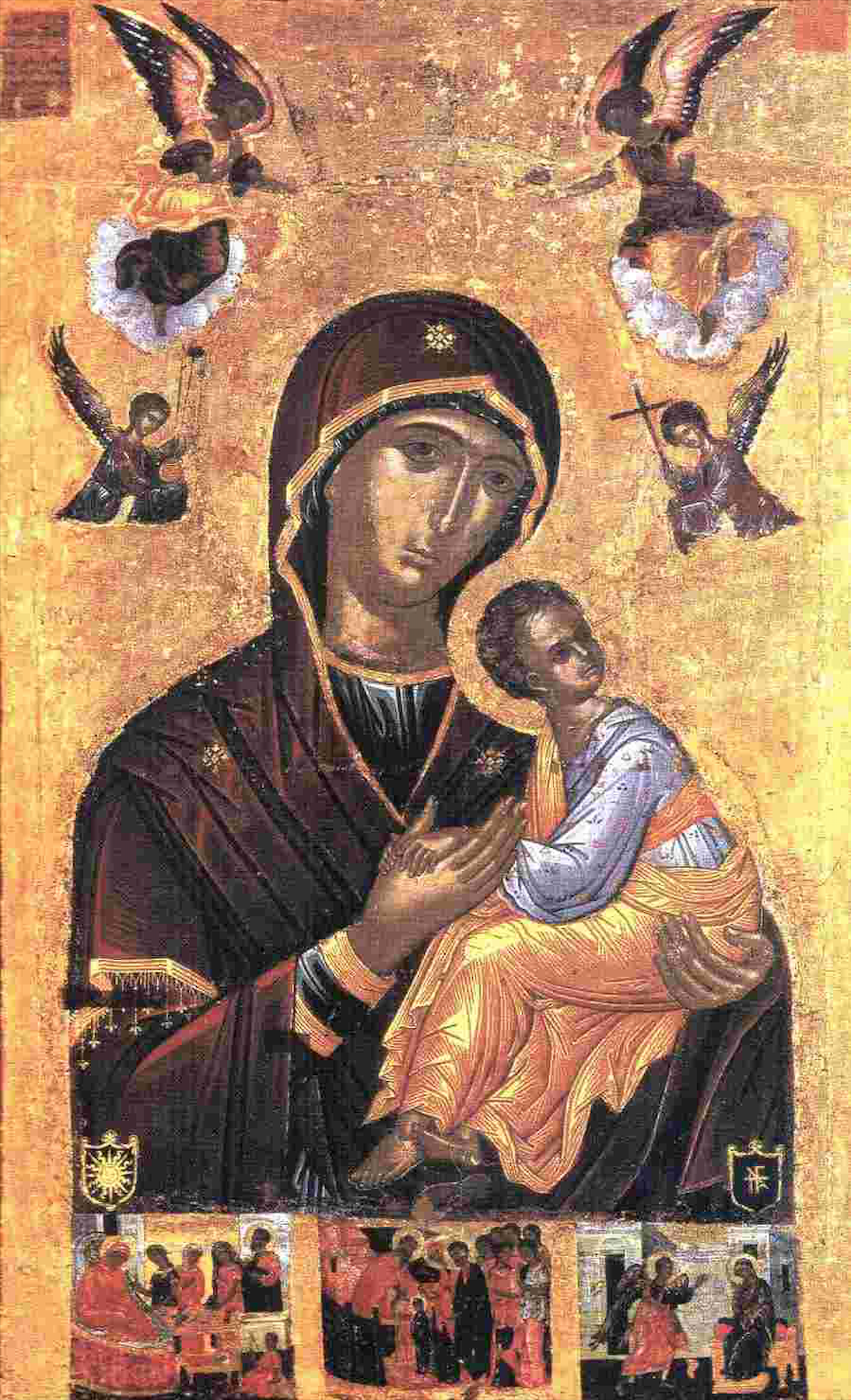
- Virgin Child with Scenes
- Born: 1620-30; Rethimno, Republic of Venice
- Died: 1690; Venice, Republic of Venice
- Known for: Painting
- Notable work: The Last Judgement
- Movement: Cretan school
- Spouse: Zanetta Trivisana

Leo or Leos Moskos (Greek: Λέος Μόσκος, 1620/30 – 1690) was a painter and educator. There were two other painters named Moskos active around the same period, Elias Moskos and Ioannis Moskos, who may have been his relatives. Indeed, Leo is often confused with Elias Moskos. Some of his work was inspired by Georgios Klontzas and Franghias Kavertzas. He traveled all over the Venetian Empire. Records indicate he traveled to Venice, Cephalonia, and Zakynthos His style resembled the Cretan school. He taught famous painter Panagiotis Doxaras. His most popular work is the Last Judgment. His paintings can be found all over the world. Twenty of his paintings have survived.

== History ==
Leo was born in Rethimno, Crete sometime between 1620 and 1635. His father's name was George. He was active in Crete, Zakynthos, and Venice. He is often confused with Elias Moskos. The first record of the artist is in Zakynthos around 1653. According to Venetian records, he is first mentioned in Venice on 1655, 1656, 1664 as the sponsor of several baptisms. The priest of the church San Giorgio dei Greci was painter Philotheos Skoufos. Skoufos was later replaced by painter Emmanuel Tzanes. Tzanes's brother Konstantinos Tzanes was also actively painting in Venice. In 1657, another artist named Ioannis Moskos was married at the San Giorgio dei Greci.

To date, there are no records linking Leos and Ioannis Moskos but a familial relationship is possible. From 1664 to 1666 he is recorded on the island of Cephalonia. On September 30, 1664, there is an agreement between the commissioners of the church of the Ascension in Lixouri and Leo to paint 13 icons. Namely, a large icon of the Ascension, two Archangels at the pulpits, and Christ. The painter's fee was set at 150 realia and the time of completion of the work was May 1665.

In March 1665 the church commissioners were looking for money for the ongoing work. On February 17, 1666, Sir Leos Moskos son of Sir George appointed the priest Symeon Maroudas as his commissioner in Zakynthos. He signed the document Leos Moskos. Recall, Elias Moskos was an active painter in Zakynthos around this period. There might be some familial relationship. Leo was back in Lixouri on October 21, 1666, and signed as a witness.

He appears in Zakynthos after 1666 with reference to a Diptych. It is now at the Museum of Zakynthos. The item was taken from the church of Agios Georgios. It was founded in 1669. Around this time, Moskos made an agreement to teach Panagiotis Doxaras's painting in Zakynthos. Regrettably, the published date of the contract was 1685. Leo was in Venice around that time, so he probably taught him around 1670. Another theory is that the contract was made up in Zakynthos but Panagiotis Doxaras might have traveled to Venice.

Leo lived in Venice from 1678 to 1688 according to the register of the Greek Brotherhood. In 1681, he was the sponsor of another baptism. He sponsored four recorded baptisms. By this time Moskos also got married. He was married on October 16, 1681. He was recorded in the wedding book as Leo Mosko of Rethimno marrying Zanetta Trivisana from Padua. In 1684, he was the scribe of the Greek Brotherhood of Venice. Book VII of the Minutes of its assemblies recorded the famous painter offering a painting of the Presentation of the Virgin. The painting was for the assembly hall of the Brotherhood. He was also recorded as a witness to baptisms from 1688 to 1690.

== The Last Judgement ==
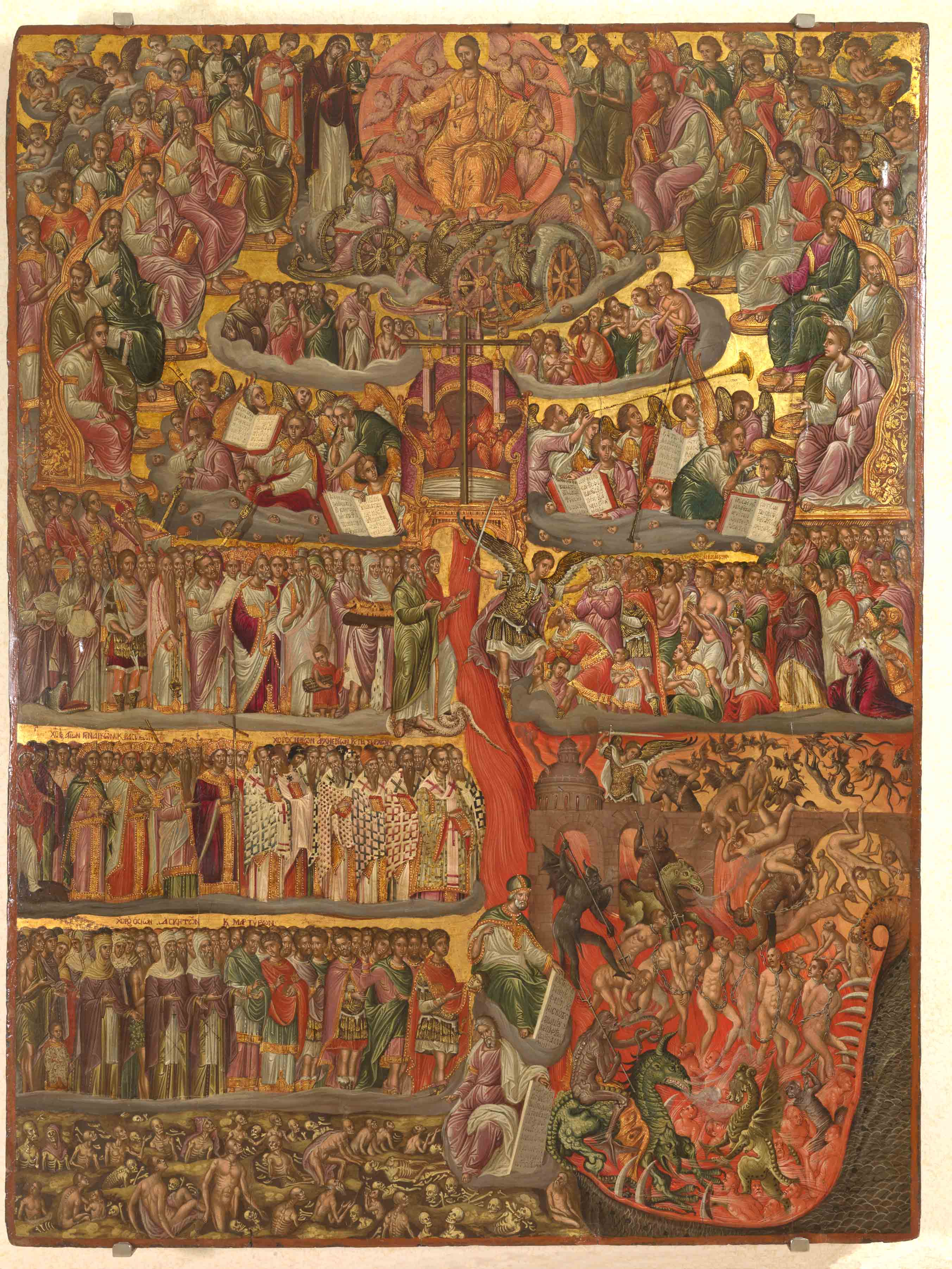
The Last Judgement, Georgios Klontzas (1535-1608)

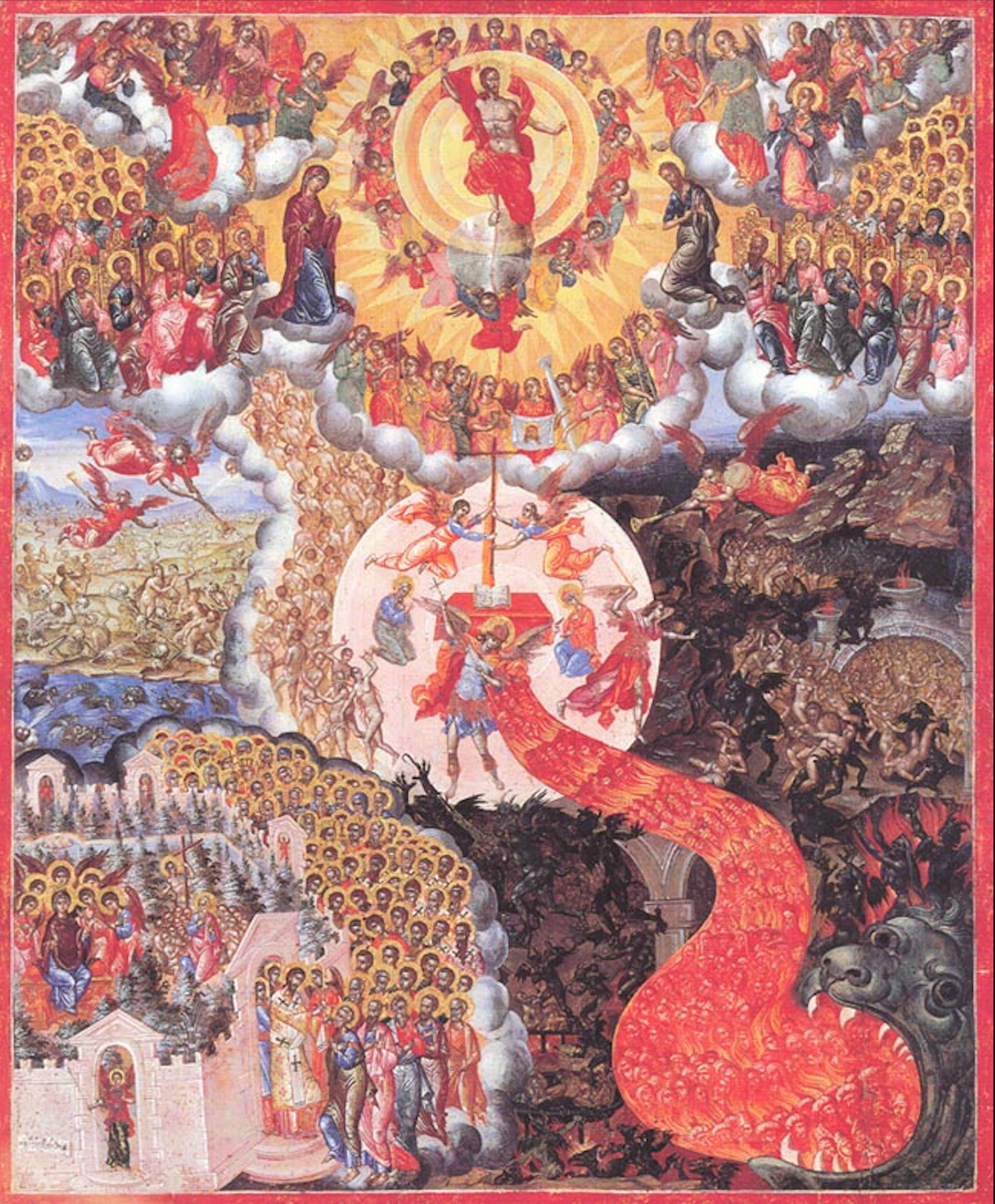
The Last Judgement Leos Moskos 1653

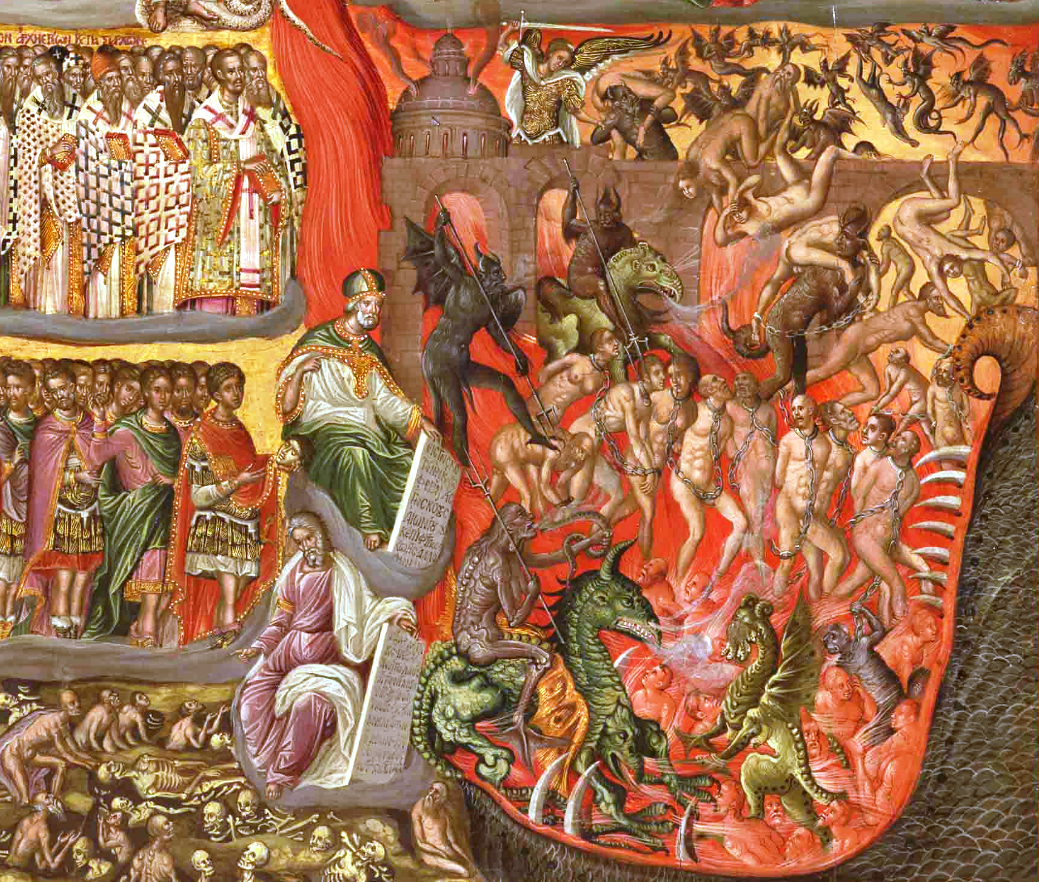
Close Up, Georgios Klontzas (1535-1608)

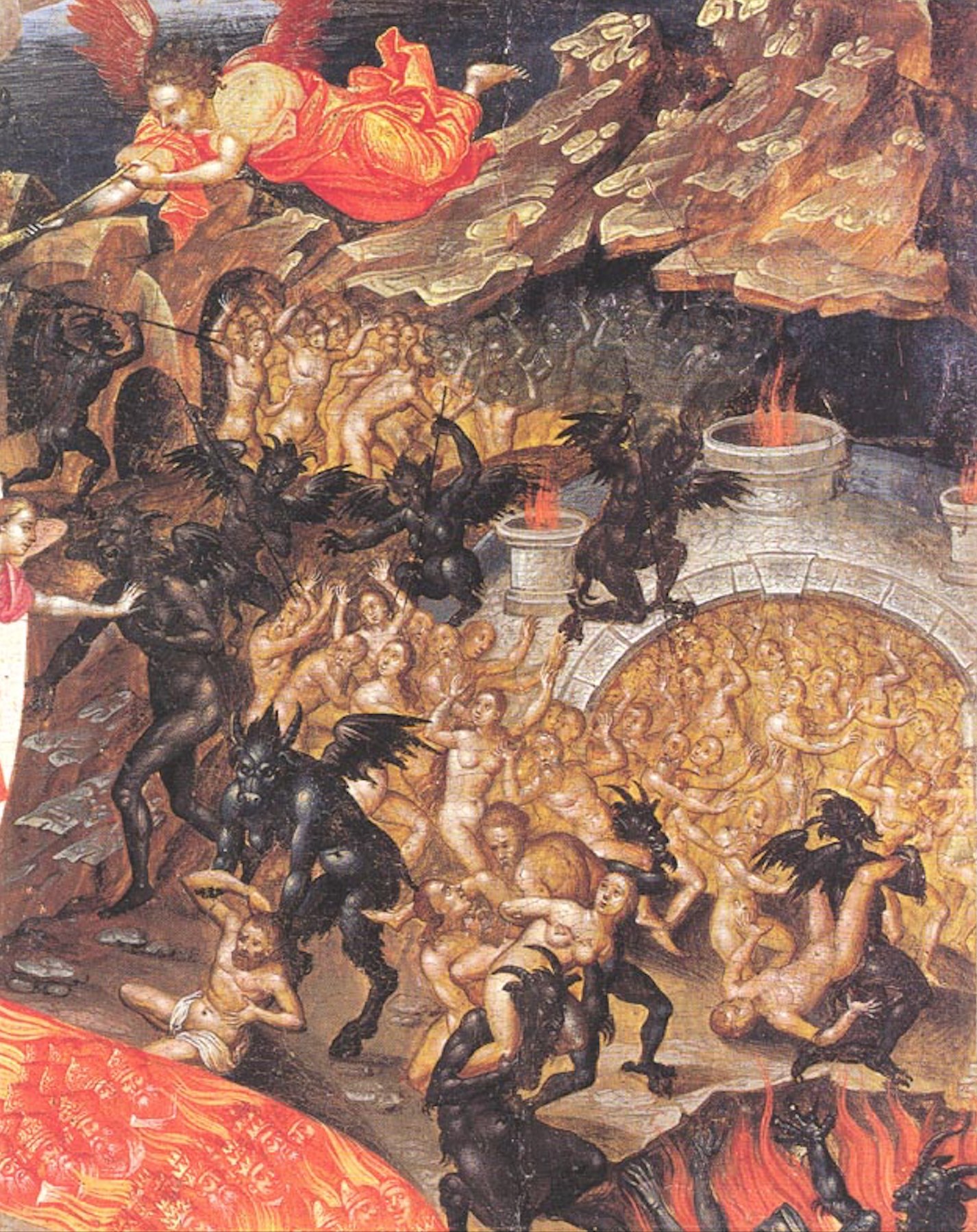
Closeup Leos Moskos

The last judgment has been a popular theme in art. Michelangelo painted the theme in the Sistine Chapel, The Last Judgment (Michelangelo). Christian denominations consider the Second Coming of Christ to be the final and infinite judgment by God. The theme has been covered in countless artistic mediums. There is no indication that Georgios Klontzas visited the Sistine Chapel but it is a possibility. Georgios Klontzas last judgment is a very popular and important painting. It inspired countless artists. Moskos also painted a similar subject. His work is not identical to Georgios Klontzas but the two paintings are closely similar.

In the Klontzas Jesus is at the very top of the painting. It resembles Klontzas In Thee Rejoiceth because the heavenly hierarchy extends outwards. The virgin is to the left of Jesus. The twelve apostles surround Jesus followed by other angles. Under Jesus, there are angels on chariots. Below the angles to the left and the right of the cross are people waiting to be judged. Music is an integral part of the scene. A musical ensemble is under the people waiting to be judged. Instruments are featured and the book life is opened, similar to Michelangelo's Last Judgment. The musical angles are next to the gateway. Next to the lava is an Angle with a sword guiding the damned into purgatory. Under the scene is hell. To the left of hell are saints, church clergy, and chosen nobles. The hell scene is a phenomenal artistic interpretation of purgatory.

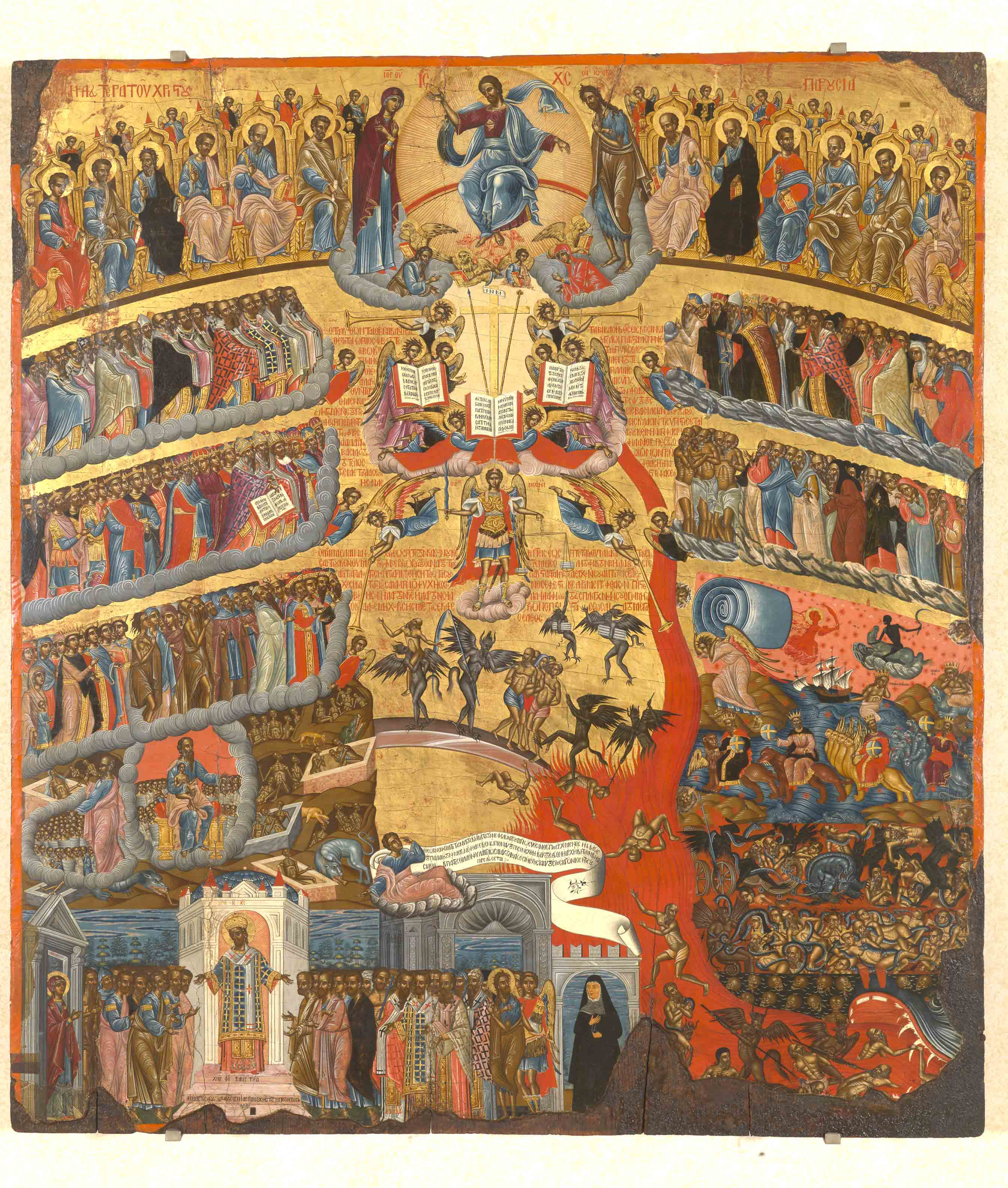
Kavertzas Last Judgment 1640-41

In the Moskos, Jesus is located at the same place. There are circles of Angles. The Virgin is to the left of Jesus. The Twelve Apostles are further from the center. They are under the angelic hierarchy. Music is also part of the scene. Under Jesus, some of the Angles are holding instruments. There is an angle holding the Holy Towel. Clearly, in the Moskos, there is a distinction between the damned and the chosen. All of the damned people are naked. At the lower-left corner are the chosen clergy, nobles. In the center an angle over stands at the entrance of the lava or doorway to hell.

Dragons are a common theme in Klontzas's work. In purgatory, demons are riding dragons. The damned are in chains and nude. They are carried off by demons. Theodore Poulakis also employs similar wolflike demonic creatures in his work resembling Klontzas. In the Moskos, there are the same demon wolflike creatures. The people are all naked and they carried off to hell. In the lower right, there is a mouth eating the lave. This is the only dragon-like creature in the Moskos. Both paintings are extremely similar. Moskos's was inspired by Klontzas's work. Franghias Kavertzas also had a similar painting it also inspired Moskos. Many other artists also employed a similar theme resembling the artist's paintings.

== Gallery ==
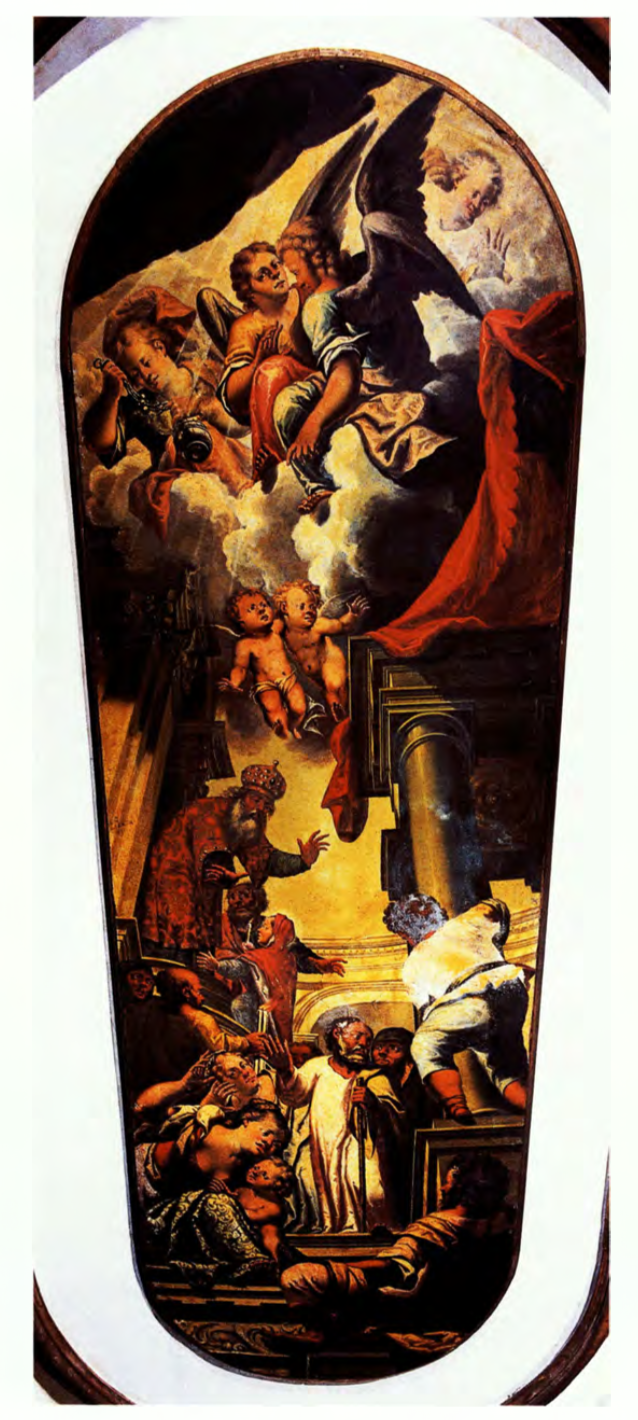
Presentation of Mary

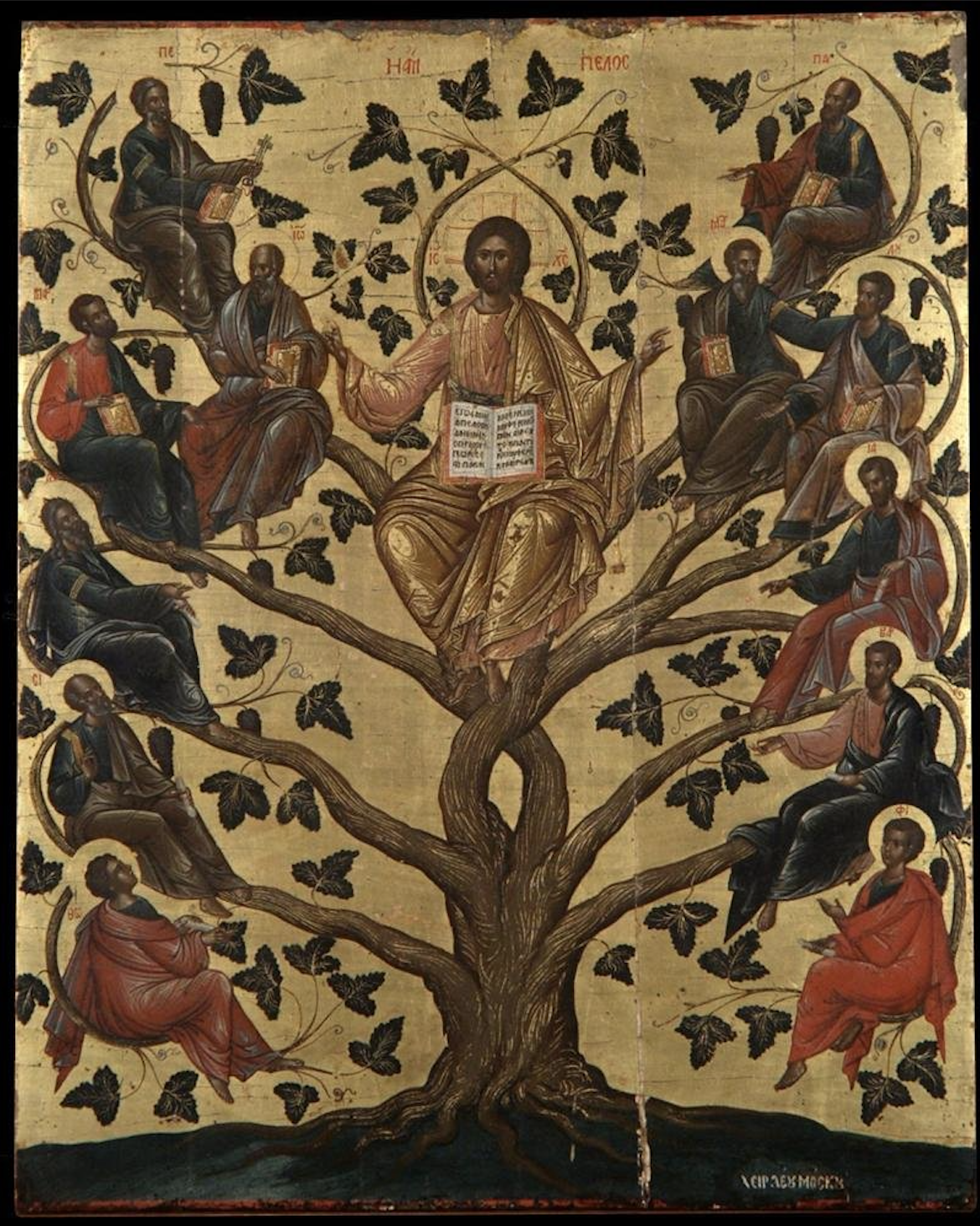
Christ on a Vine Benaki Museum

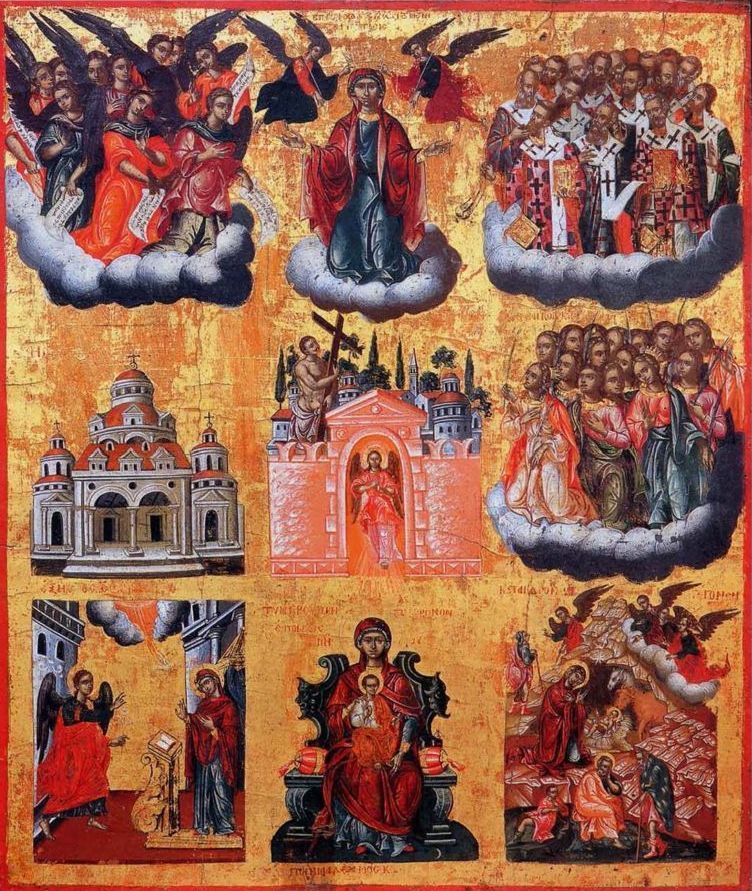
In Thee Rejoiceth

== Notable works ==
- Christ the Vine (Moskos) Benaki Museum
- The Infanticide Barney Burstein's Private Collection Boston
- On You Rejoices, Piana Degli Albanesi Mezzojuso, Sicily, Italy
- Despotic Icons, Pantocrator Cephalonia
- The Last Judgment (Moskos)

== See also ==
- Theodore Poulakis
- Victor (iconographer)

== Bibliography ==
- Hatzidakis, Manolis; Drakopoulou, Evgenia (1997). Έλληνες Ζωγράφοι μετά την Άλωση (1450-1830). Τόμος 2: Καβαλλάρος - Ψαθόπουλος [Greek Painters after the Fall of Constantinople (1450-1830). Volume 2: Kavallaros - Psathopoulos]. Athens: Center for Modern Greek Studies, National Research Foundation. hdl:10442/14088. ISBN 960-7916-00-X.
- Tselenti-Papadopoulou, Niki G. (2002). Οι Εικονες της Ελληνικης Αδελφοτητας της Βενετιας απο το 16ο εως το Πρωτο Μισο του 20ου Αιωνα: Αρχειακη Τεκμηριωση [The Icons of the Greek Brotherhood of Venice from 1600 to First Half of the 20th Century]. Athens: Ministry of Culture Publication of the Archaeological Bulletin No. 81. ISBN 960-214-221-9.
