= Transfiguration and Monastic Scenes (Klontzas) =

Painting by Georgios Klontzas

- Μεταμόρφωση και Μοναστικές Σκηνές (Greek), Trasfigurazione e Scene Monastiche (Italian)
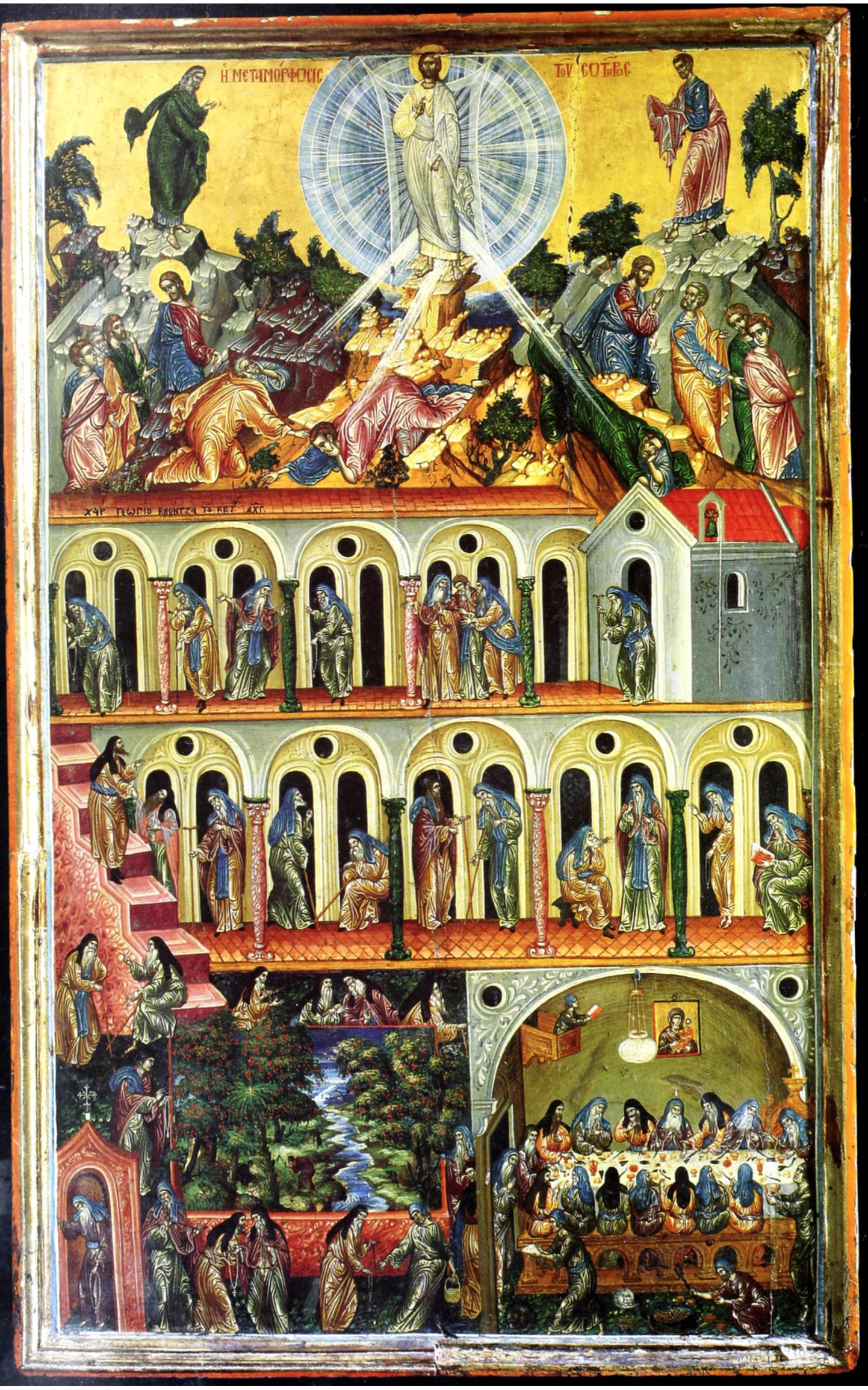
- Artist: Georgios Klontzas
- Year: c. 1603
- Medium: tempera on wood
- Subject: Transfiguration and Monastic Scenes at Saint Catherine's Monastery, Mount Sinai, Egypt
- Dimensions: 64.7 cm × 40.3 cm (25.5 in × 15.9 in)
- Location: Saint Catherine's Monastery, Mount Sinai, Egypt
- Owner: Saint Catherine's Monastery

Transfiguration and Monastic Scenes is a multi-themed tempera painting created by Greek painter Georgios Klontzas. Klontzas was a Cretan Renaissance painter. The artist was hired to assess work completed by El Greco. Klontzas was from a wealthy family and owned a successful workshop in the center of Crete. His existing catalog consists of Fifty-four works. He completed incredible triptychs and manuscripts. Klontzas and Michael Damaskinos are two of the most prominent Greek painters of the 16th century due to the size of their catalogs and the popularity of their works, excluding El Greco.

Saint Catherine's monastery at Mount Sinai is one of the most sacred religious places in the world. The site encloses where it is assumed by Christians that Moses saw the burning bush. It is one of the oldest surviving Orthodox Monasteries erected during the time of Justinian. The monastery was named after Catherine of Alexandria. Countless painters have painted the sacred place. Scottish painter David Roberts extensively used the theme in his detailed lithograph prints of Egypt. El Greco also painted the sacred monastery in the back of the Modena Triptych. Iakovos Moskos and Michael Damaskinos are two Greek painters that also included the sacred theme in their works. Transfiguration and Monastic Scenes takes place at the holy monastery. The work of art is part of the collection of Saint Catherine's Monastery in Mount Sinai, Egypt.

== Description ==
The work of art was completed in 1603 on the island of Crete five years before the painter's death. The materials used were tempera and gold leaf on a wood panel. The height of the work was 25.5 in. (64.7 cm) and the width 15.9 in. (40.3 cm). His icon consists of four main parts. The upper portion features the transfiguration, Jesus is in the center, flanked by Moses and Elijah. Both figures were associated with Mount Sinai. To the left and right there are scenes with Jesus and his followers. Two of the figures lie on a unique diagonal plane. The middle portion exhibits the monks in their daily lives standing outside of their monastic cells. The painter combines Cretan architectural complexity influenced by Venetian painting and the traditional Byzantine style.

There are two levels of monastic cells the top portion exhibits a small church building to our right. The lower level features a small stairwell to our left leading to a fantastic garden. Both levels feature Roman archways with red and green marble columns and the openings to each cell are painted with the same geometric shapes. The geometrization within the section alludes to a three-dimensional space. The painter also demonstrates the impressive attire the monks wore in the early 17th century and prayer beads are a recurring motif. The painting is a snapshot of the daily life within a monastic community. To our lower left Klontzas creates an aesthetically pleasing landscape with trees and a stream. Monks are gardening in the middle ground and in the foreground, a small group of priests gathers in front of a fence. To our right, the monks are having a meal. The table is below an illuminated lantern that brightens the room. The painter exquisitely animates the room with his brilliant use of light utilizing a chiaroscuro method. Above the group of monks at the table to our left, a monk reads from a book while suspended in the air. A traditional painting of the Virgin and Child adorns the wall. The area utilizes three-dimensional space.

The monastery was named after Catherine of Alexandria. Klontzas also included the sacred Egyptian martyr in his work. He created a painting entitled Saint Catherine's Engagement. There was a Siniatic monastery in Crete affiliated with Mount Sinai named Sinaitic Church of Saint Matthew, in Heraklion, Crete. Around the same period, Klontzas completed the Transfiguration and Monastic Scenes painter and Siniatic monk Ieremias Palladas finished his painting entitled Saint Catherine of Alexandria. The work featured Mount Sinai in the background. The painting became a Cretan prototype and was copied by countless artists.

== Gallery ==
=== Similar works ===
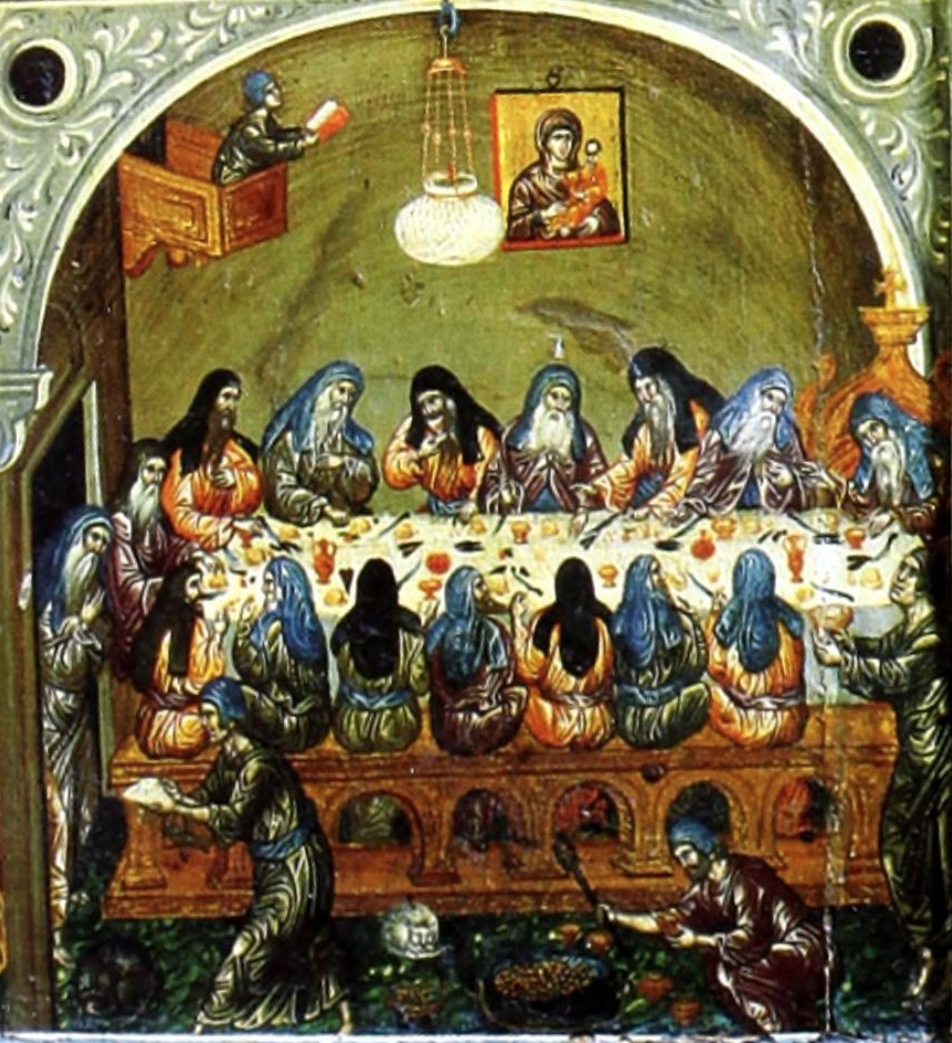
Detail of Supper

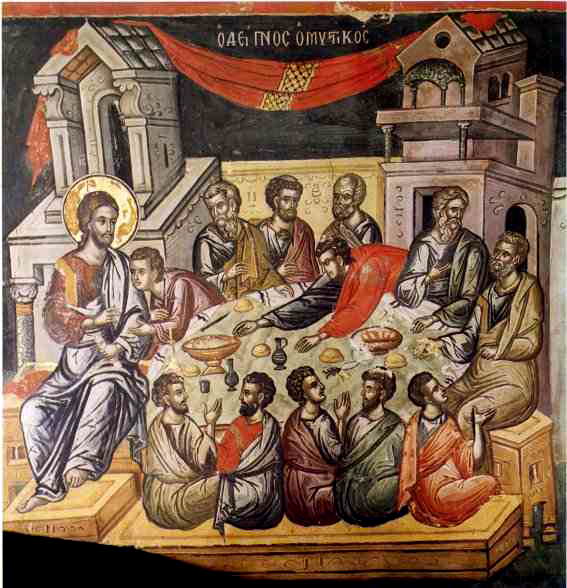
Last Supper by Theophanes the Cretan

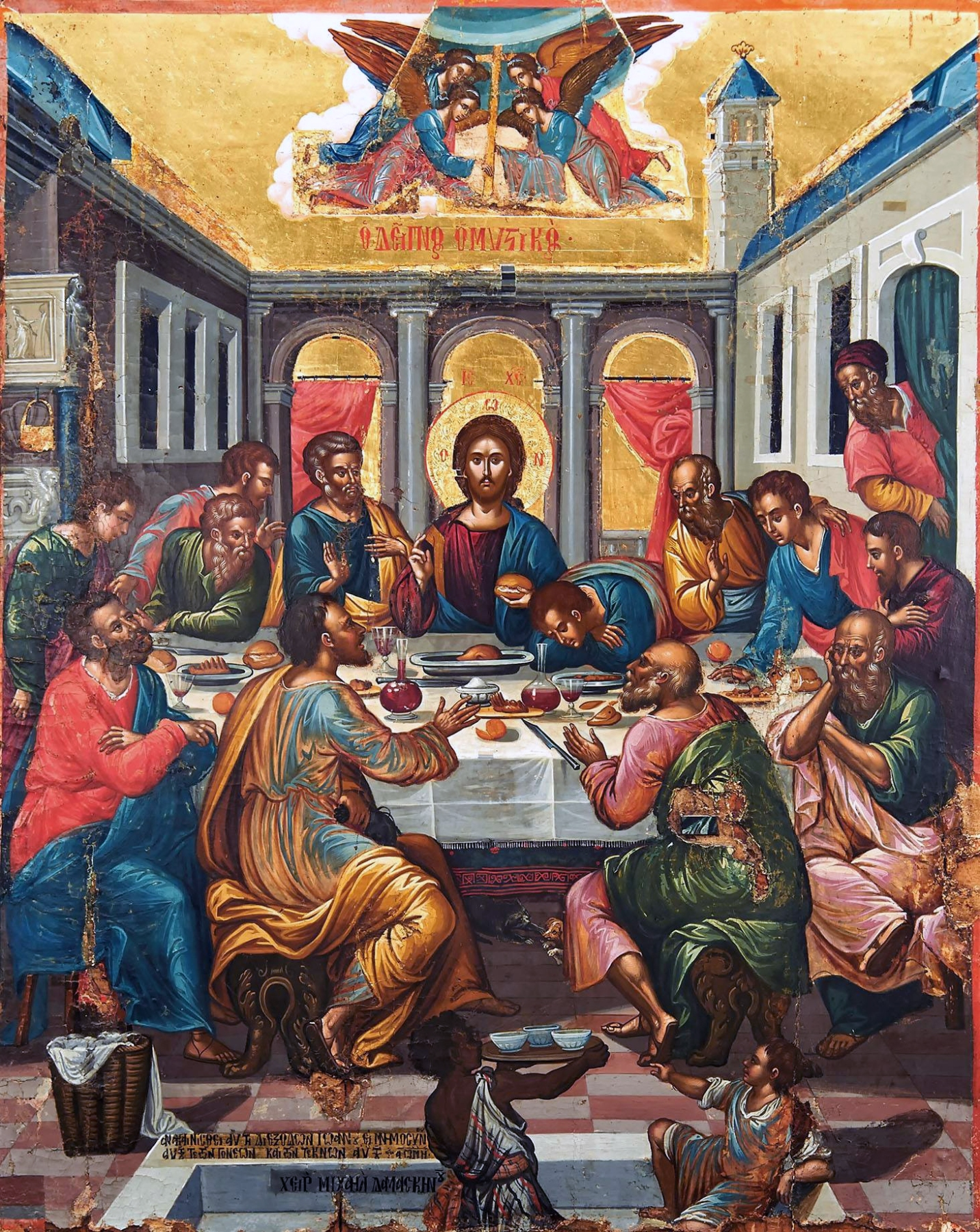
The Last Supper (Damaskinos)

=== Notable works ===
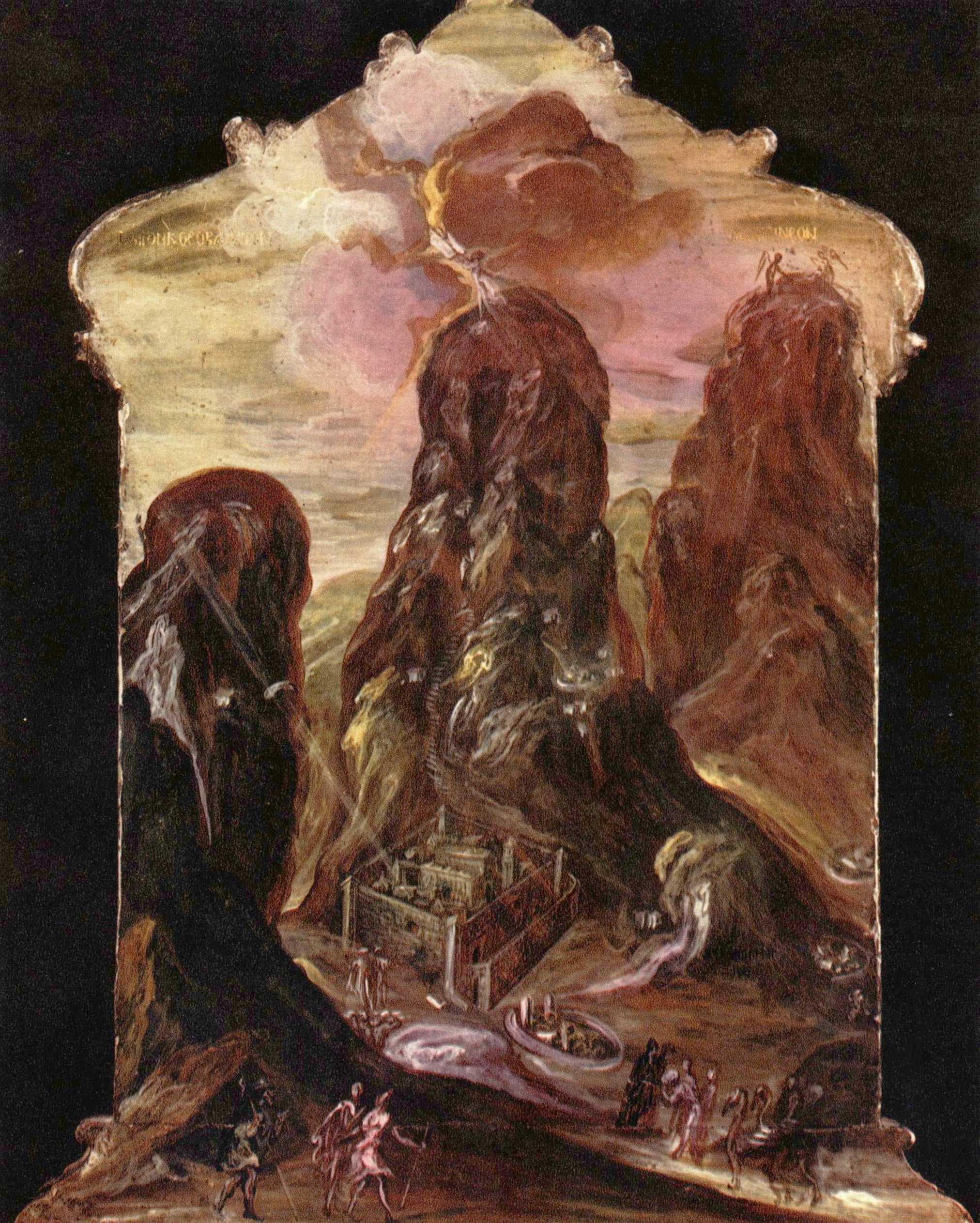
The Modena Triptych by El Greco

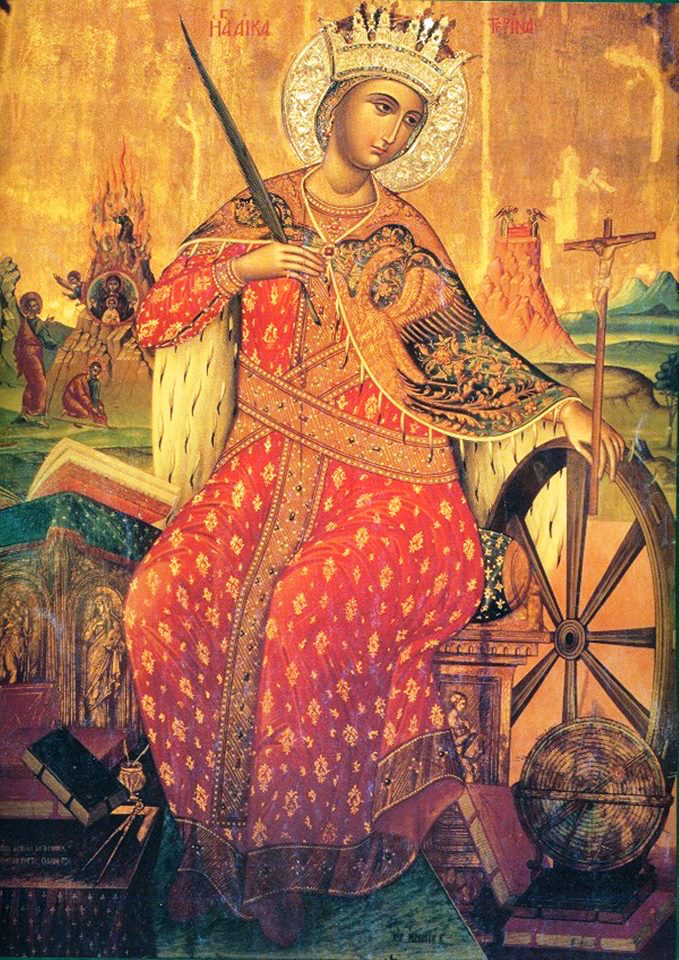
Saint Catherine with Scenes at Mount Sinai

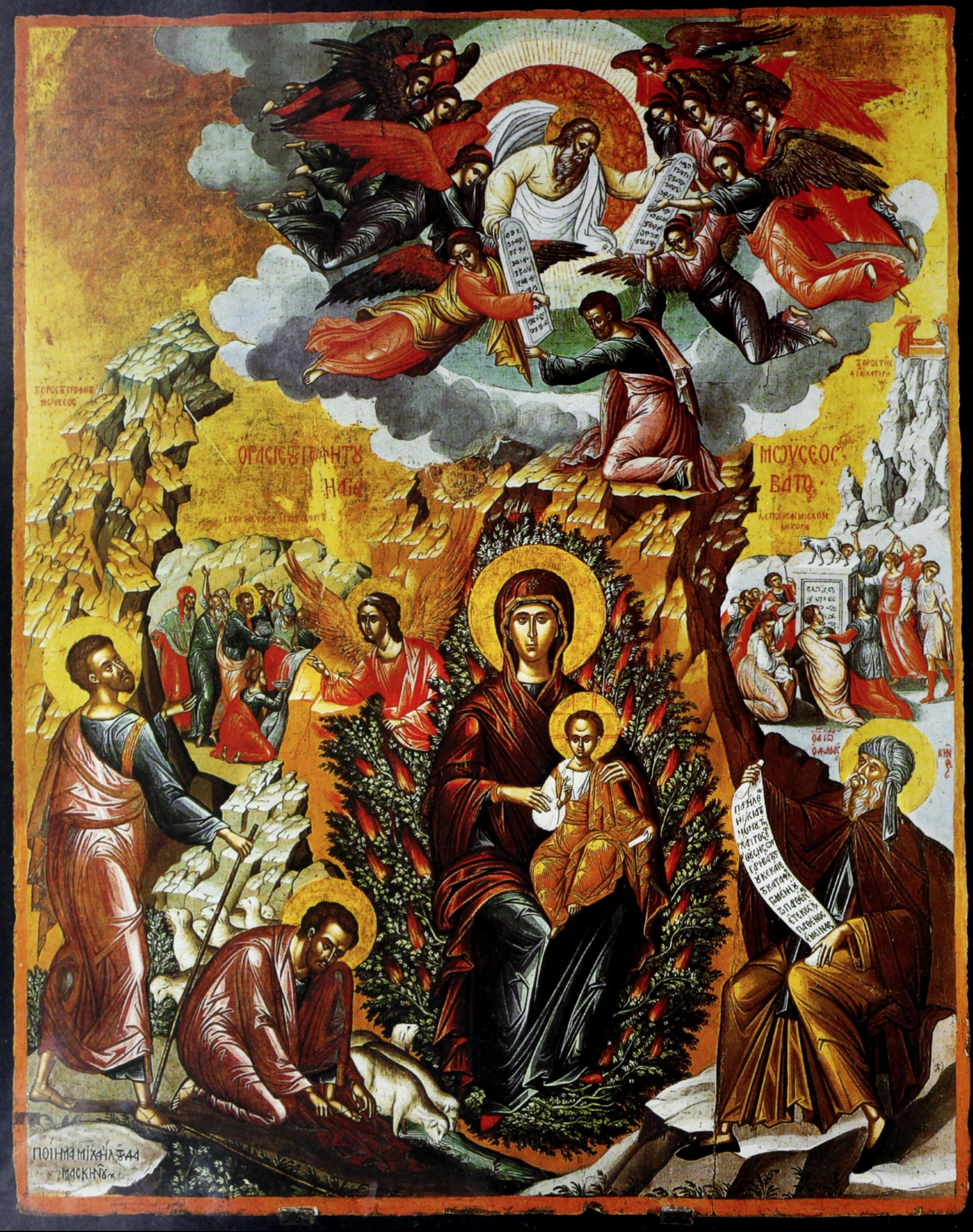
Virgin of the Burning Bush at Mount Sinai

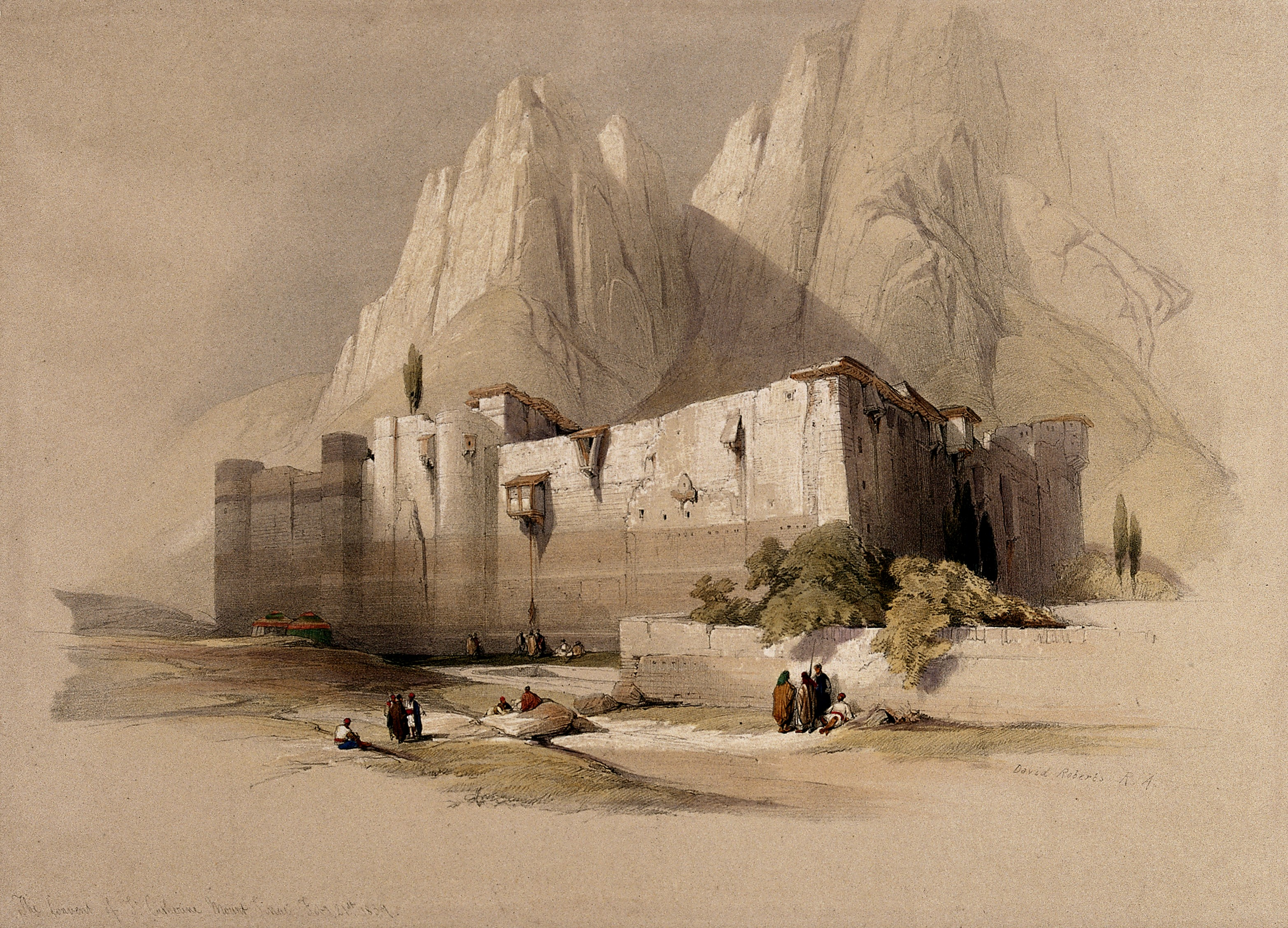
Monastery of St. Catherine David Roberts

== See also ==
- The Last Supper (Damaskinos)

== Bibliography ==
- Hatzidakis, Manolis; Drakopoulou, Evgenia (1997). Έλληνες Ζωγράφοι μετά την Άλωση (1450-1830). Τόμος 2: Καβαλλάρος - Ψαθόπουλος [Greek Painters after the Fall of Constantinople (1450-1830). Volume 2: Kavallaros - Psathopoulos]. Athens: Center for Modern Greek Studies, National Research Foundation. hdl:10442/14088. ISBN 960-7916-00-X.
- Collins, Kristen M. (2006). Holy Image, Hallowed Ground: Icons from Sinai. Los Angeles: California: J. Paul Getty Museum. ISBN 9780892368563.
- Lopera, Jose Alvarez (1999). El Greco: Identity and Transformation. New York, NY: Skira. ISBN 8881184745.
- Vafea, Flora (2017). "The Astronomical Instruments in Saint Catherine's Iconography at the Holy Monastery of Sinai The Almagest Volume 8, Issue 2". Almagest. 8 (2). Paris, France: University of Paris: 87. doi:10.1484/J.ALMAGEST.5.114932.
- Evans, Helen C. (2004). Saint Catherine's Monastery, Sinai, Egypt A Photographic Essay. New York, NY: Metropolitan Museum of Art in collaboration with Saint Catherine's Monastery, Sinai. ISBN 9781588391094.
