= Maroulis (surname) =

Maroulis is a surname. Notable people with the surname include:

- Constantine Maroulis
- Helen Maroulis
- Georgilas Maroulis
- Athanasios Maroulis
- Michael Marouli
