= Ioannis Tzen =

Greek baroque painter

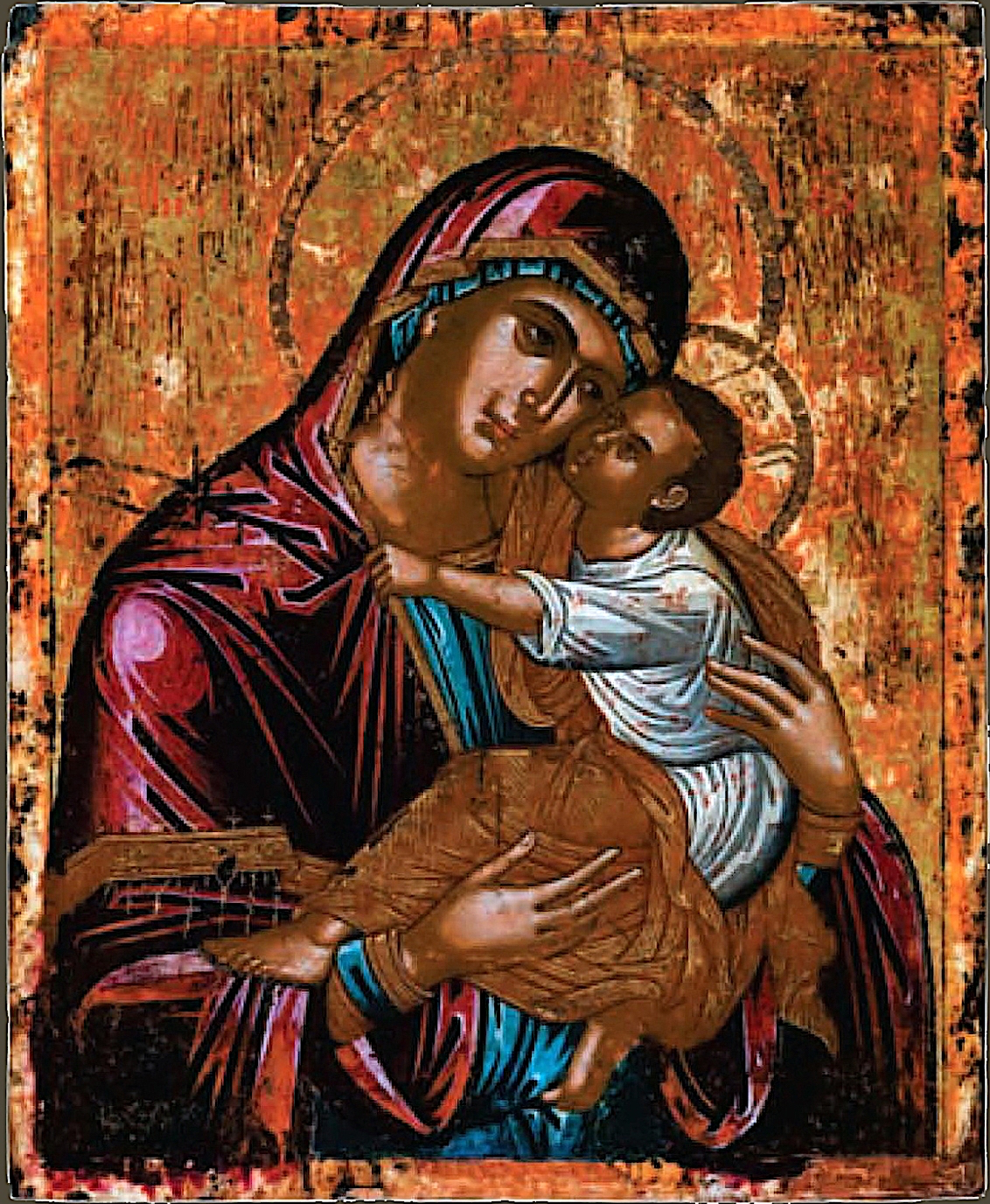
- Virgin and Child
- Born: 1600s Crete, Greek
- Died: 1600s Corfu, Greece
- Movement: Cretan School; Heptanese School; Greek Baroque
- Other names: Ioannis Tzenos
- Citizenship: Venetian
- Occupation: Painter
- Years active: 1660-1682
- Era: 17th Century
- Style: Maniera Greca

Ioannis Tzen (Greek: Ιωάννης Τζέν) also known as Ioannis Dzenos (Greek: Ιωάννης Ντζένος), was a 17th-century Greek baroque painter. He was active on the Ionian islands and a prominent member of the local school. He also represented Crete towards the end of the Cretan School. His painting style reflects an affiliation with Emmanuel Tzanes. He was active on the island Corfu. Greek painters affiliated with the same island active during the same period were Theodore Poulakis, Stephanos Tzangarolas. Fifteen of his works have survived. His most notable work is a painting of the Virgin and Child.

== History ==
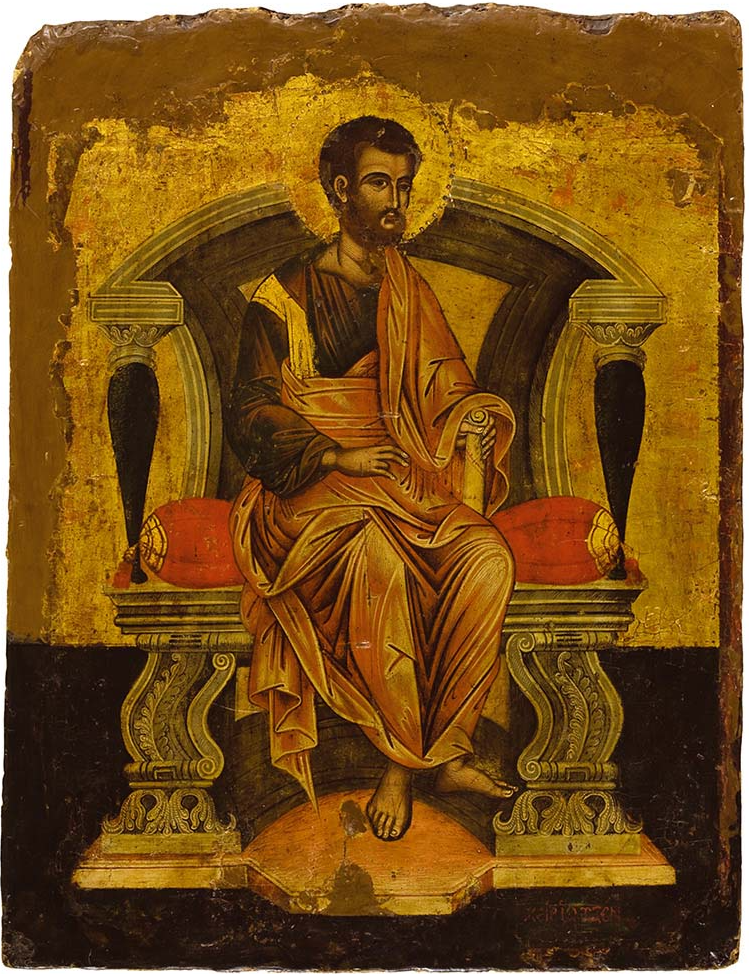
Apostle Enthroned

Tzen was from the island of Crete. He had an active workshop on the island. He eventually left the island following the example of Philotheos Skoufos, Elias Moskos, and Emmanuel Tzanes. The painters fled Crete because of the Cretan War. Tzen was active on the Ionian Islands. Tzen’s work reflects an affiliation with Emmanuel Tzanes. He eventually settled on the island of Corfu. Theodore Poulakis was active on the island around the same period.

One of his notable paintings features archangels. Famous Greek painter Georgios Kortezas painted a similar theme. Both artists painted hidden symbols in their work. Tzen’s painting featured Jesus on a shield. In the Kortezas the Archangel Gabriel holds a shield illuminated with an image of the Virgin and Child. An example of his signature was χείρ Τζέν.

== See also ==
- Georgios Kortezas

== Bibliography ==
- Hatzidakis, Manolis; Drakopoulou, Evgenia (1997). Έλληνες Ζωγράφοι μετά την Άλωση (1450-1830). Τόμος 2: Καβαλλάρος - Ψαθόπουλος [Greek Painters after the Fall of Constantinople (1450-1830). Volume 2: Kavallaros - Psathopoulos]. Athens: Center for Modern Greek Studies, National Research Foundation. hdl:10442/14088. ISBN 960-7916-00-X.
