= Saint Catherine of Alexandria (Palladas, Heraklion) =

Painting by Ieremias Palladas

Saint Catherine
- Αγία Αικατερίνη (Greek), Caterina d'Alessandria (Italian)
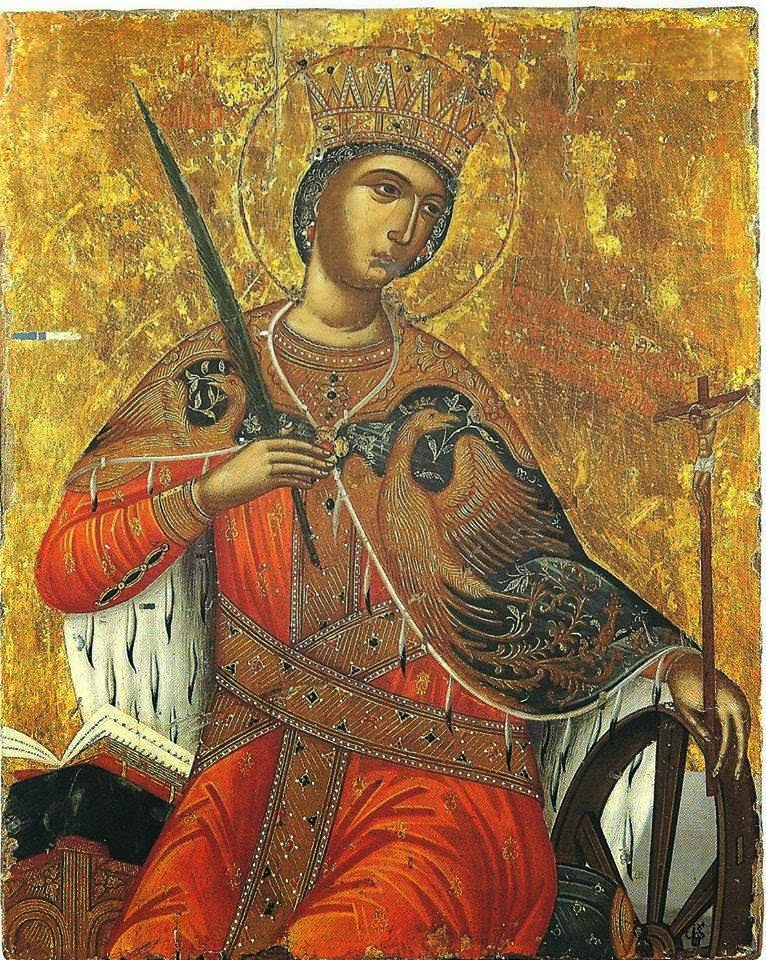
- Artist: Ieremias Palladas
- Year: c. 1608
- Medium: tempera on wood
- Subject: Saint Catherine of Alexandria
- Dimensions: 99 cm × 84 cm (38.9 in × 33 in)
- Location: Sinaitic Church of Saint Matthew, Heraklion, Crete
- Owner: Sinaitic Church of Saint Matthew

Saint Catherine is a tempera painting created by Ieremias Palladas. Palladas was a Greek painter from Crete. He was a Sinaitic monk. He was associated with Saint Catherine's sacred monastery in Egypt also known as Mount Sinai. The monastery is at the location where Mosses received his tablets. There was a dependency of the monastery in Heraklion, Crete by the same name. Palladas completed works for the monastery in Egypt. He also created works for the Holy Sepulture in Jerusalem and a church in Bethlehem. His version of the martyr became the framework of Cretan paintings of Saint Catherine. Another Sinaitic monk named Theocharis Silvestros worked with Palladas. He also created notable versions of Saint Catherine around the same period.

Saint Catherine was both a princess and a scholar. She was from Alexandria, Egypt. She was alive between 287-305. She was a follower of the new Christian faith. She converted hundreds of followers to the new faith. She was imprisoned by Emperor Maxentius. Twelve days after, her dungeon was opened and a bright light and perfume fragrance filled the room. Emperor Maxentius offered to marry the princess. She refused and the emperor condemned Catherine to death on a spiked breaking wheel. At her touch, the wheel shattered. Maxentius had her beheaded instead. She ordered the execution to commence. A milk-like substance rather than blood flowed from her neck. Artists in Crete began to depict Catherine with the wheel of her torture. Palladas’s painting features the wheel of her condemnation. The painting is currently at the Sinaitic Church of Saint Matthew, in Heraklion, Crete.

== Description ==
The icon is an egg tempera painting on gold leaf and wood panel. The Height is 99 cm (38.9 in) and the Width is 84 cm (33 in). The painting is in good condition and is over four hundred years old. The icon features the traditional gold background. Her cape-like pellegrina is covered with the Double-headed eagle. She wears a crown. The crown symbolizes her royal lineage. In her left hand, she holds the wheel of her torture. She also grasps a small cross over the wheel. In her right hand, she holds a martyr's palm. To her far right, below her elbow a book is open. The book symbolizes her vast level of knowledge.

Her clothing features clear lines and contours. Her garment is decorated with elaborate precious stones. Shadows accentuate flesh tones and facial features. The painter uses a mixture of red, brown, white, and black colors. The shape of the princesses head, her stance, and her facial expression became the standard for painters of the Cretan School. Four years later, Palladas painted a similar version of Saint Catherine for the iconostasis of Saint Catherine's Monastery, with a larger landscape and more objects. It is one of the most copied paintings of the Cretan School. Notable versions were created by: Theocharis Silvestros, Emmanuel Lambardos, Philotheos Skoufos, Victor, and Stephanos Tzangarolas.

== Gallery ==
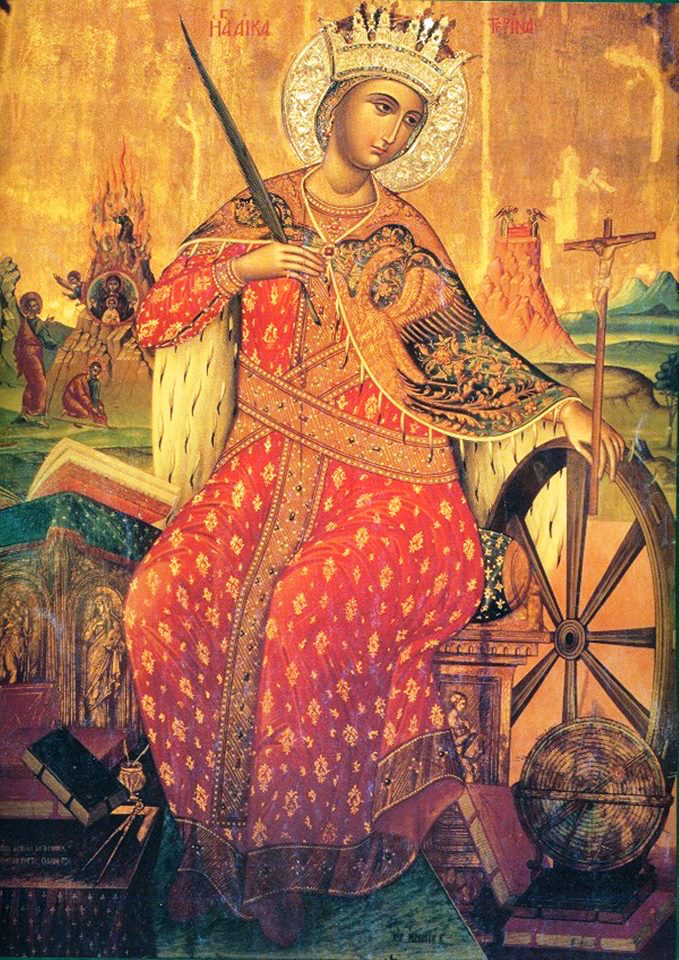
Palladas Saint Catherine Iconostasis Mount Sinai

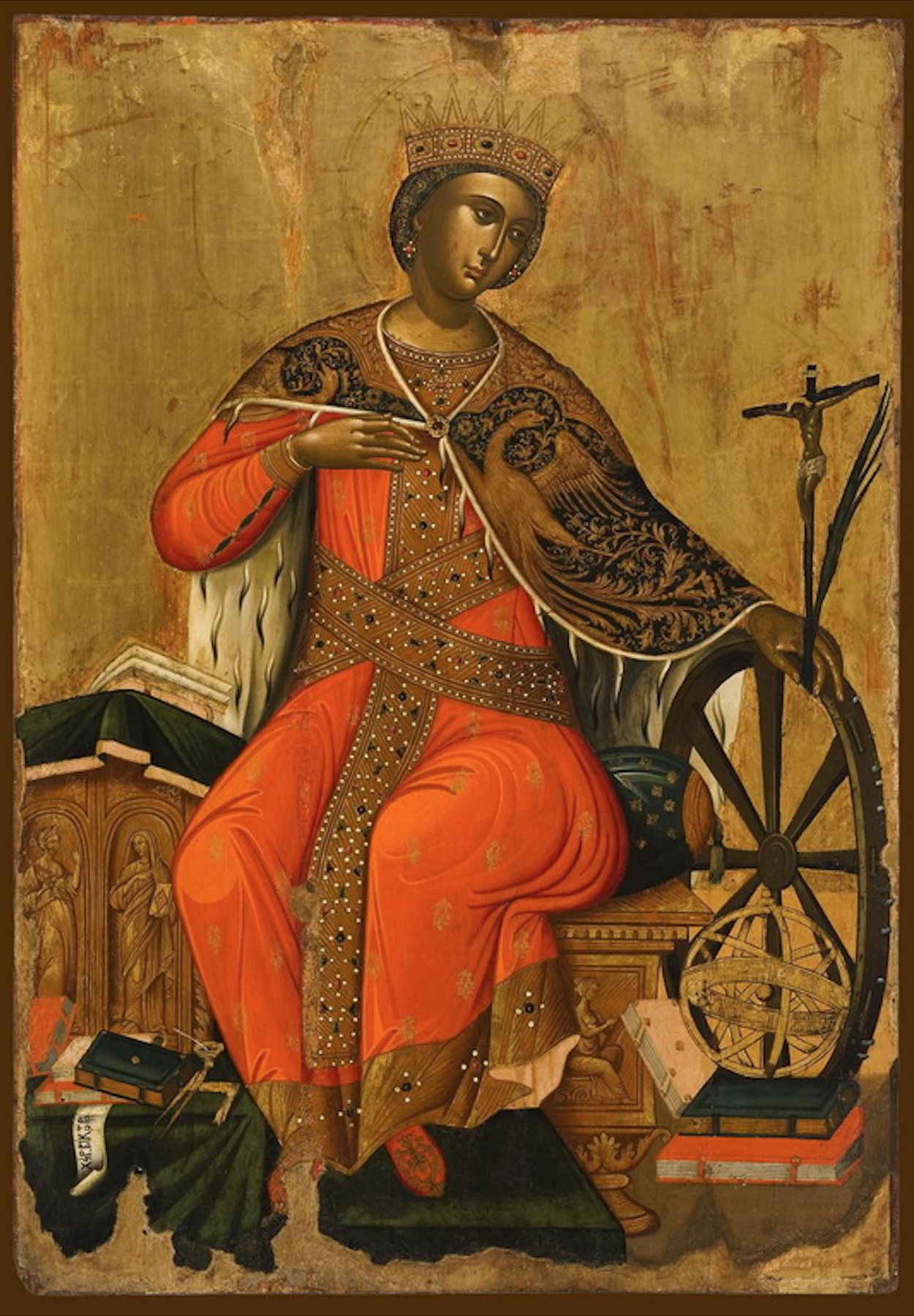
Victor Saint Catherine
