= Georgios Kortezas =

17th-century Greek painter

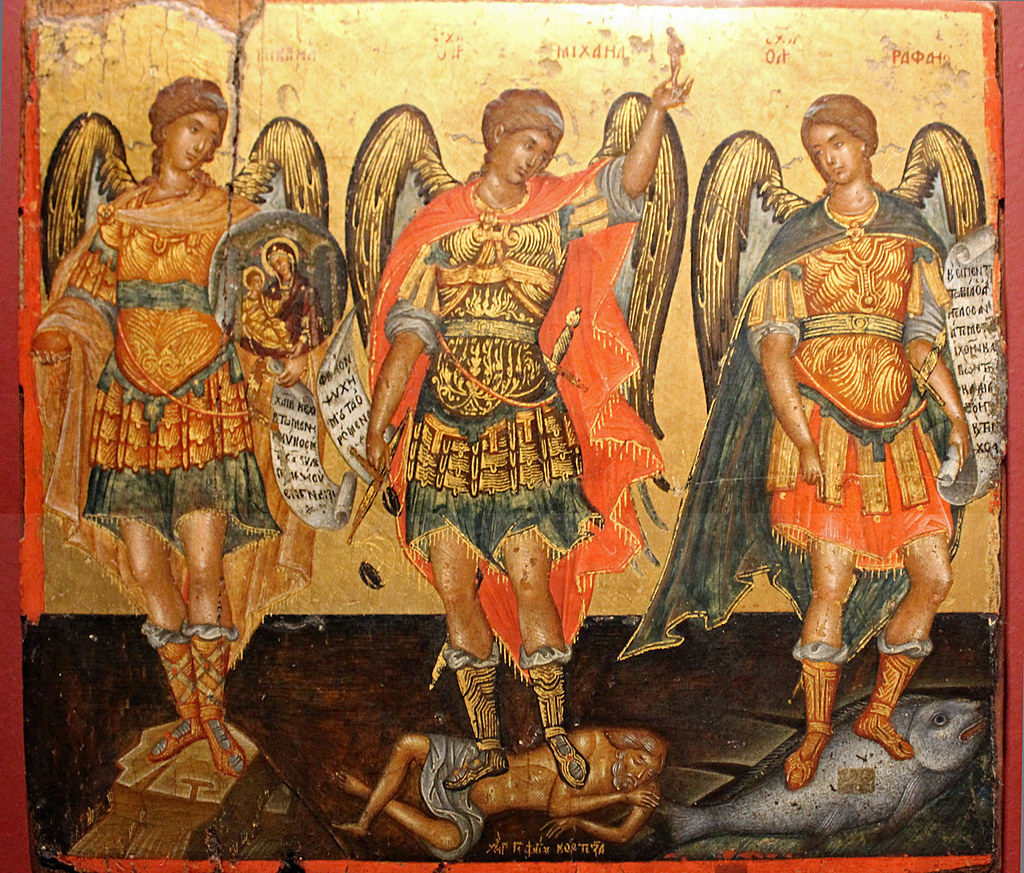
- Archangels Michael, Gabriel and Raphael
- Born: Heraklion, Republic of Venice
- Died: Heraklion, Republic of Venice
- Movement: Cretan school
- Other name: Tzortzis Kourtezas
- Citizenship: Venetian
- Occupation: Painter
- Years active: 1620–1645
- Era: 17th century
- Style: Maniera Greca

Georgios Kortezas (Greek: Γεώργιος Κορτεζάς), also known as Tzortzis Kourtezas (Greek: Τζώρτζης Κουρτεζάς), was a 17th-century Greek Baroque painter. He was a member of the Cretan school. He was from a wealthy family. Notable Greek painters active during the same period were Georgilas Maroulis, Ieremias Palladas and Theocharis Silvestros. His style was the Venetian influenced Greek mannerism with some Byzantine influence characteristic of Cretan art. Three of his works survived. The Tragedy of Saint Demetrios. The painting is at the Benaki Museum. The Archangels Gabriel, Micheal, and Raphael. Poli Museum, Corfu. Finally, George Slaying the Dragon is part of the Provatorov Collection in Geneva.

== History ==
He was born in Heraklion. His father's name was Michalis. Georgios was actively painting in the early part of the 1600s. He had a workshop in Heraklion. Records exist regarding his family's financial matters on the island of Crete between 1620 and 1645. He painted mainly religious themes. His works parallel the Greek mannerisms prevalent at the time on the island of Crete. His painting of the archangels is a demonstration of the superior craftsmanship prevalent on the island.

The work offers a wide range of hidden symbols and meanings. From left to right the Archangel Gabriel holds a ball in his right hand and a shield in his left hand. The shield is illuminated with an image of the Virgin and Child. He also holds a scroll. The middle figure Micheal holds up a man in his left hand. In his right hand, he holds a scroll. He also stands on an evil figure stomping out darkness. The final figure Raphael stands on a fish. He points at a big fish with his right finger eluding that he is the bringer of fish to the local fisherman. In his left hand, he also holds a scroll. All three figures hold a scroll. The work is signed at the bottom Χειρ. Γεωργίου Κορτεζα.

== See also ==
- Ioannis Apakas

== Bibliography ==
- Hatzidakis, Manolis (1987). Greek painters after the fall (1450-1830) Volume A. Athens, GR: Center for Modern Greek Studies E.I.E.
- Hatzidakis, Manolis & Drakopoulou, Eugenia (1997). Greek painters after the fall (1450-1830) Volume B. Athens, GR: Center for Modern Greek Studies E.I.E.
- Drakopoulou, Eugenia (2010). Greek painters after the fall (1450-1830) Volume C. Athens, GR: Center for Modern Greek Studies E.I.E.
