= Neilos =

Greek painter and archbishop (1600–1660)

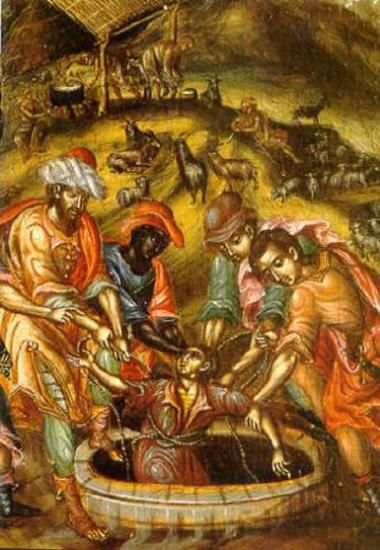
- Detail from the Story of Joseph
- Born: 1600; Crete
- Died: 1660 (aged 59–60)
- Known for: Iconography and hagiography
- Movement: Cretan school
- Elected: Archbishop

Neilos (Greek: Νείλος; 1600 – 1660), also known as Neilos Kokolitza (Greek: Νείλος Κοκολήτζας), was a Greek painter, monk, and archbishop. He was the archbishop of Kea and Thira. He was a prominent member of the Cretan School. His contemporaries at the time were Ieremias Palladas, and Theocharis Silvestros. He influenced the works of countless Greek and Italian artists. He is one of few Greek painters who had a high rank within the church. Another high ranking Greek painter was Archpresbyter Andreas Karantinos. Several of his works have survived and they can be found in the museum of Gonia Monastery. His most popular work is The Story of Joseph.

== History ==
Neilos was born in Crete. He was a monk. Not much is known about his life. In 1642, he painted the history of Joseph. He signed the painting. The name Kokolitza also appears on the painting it may have been his last name. Four years later. On December 5, 1646, the Ecumenical Council elected Neilos the Archbishop of Kea and Thira. Twelve years later the former Patriarch of Constantinople Joannicius II was a bishop at the Metropolis of Kea and Thira.

Italian historian Giuseppe Gerola was the first to characterize the work of Neilos in his second volume on the Venetian monuments of Crete. Neilos’s painting of Joseph has a high level of sophistication and is an example of the fusion of Byzantine, Venetian, and Cretan painting. The dimensions of the painting are 1.01 x 0.90 meters or 3.3 x 3 feet.

The figures resemble Michael Damaskinos’s work. Each frame has an exquisite visual story about Joseph's life according to the Old Testament narrative. The detail in the painting is a reflection of Neilos’s hi-level of training. It was very rare for a hi ranking member of the church to be a painter. The signature on the piece is ΧΕΙΡ ΝΕΙΛΟΥ Α ΚΟΚΟΛΗΤΖΑ ΕΝ ΕΤΕΙ ΑΧΜΒ (Hand of Neilos A Kokolitzas in the year 1642).

== Gallery ==
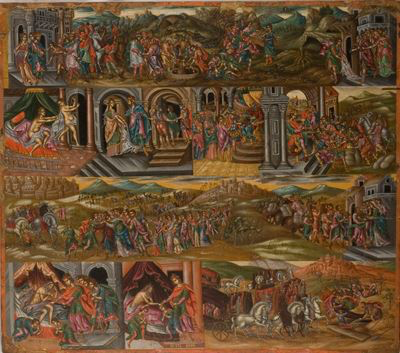
The Story of Joseph

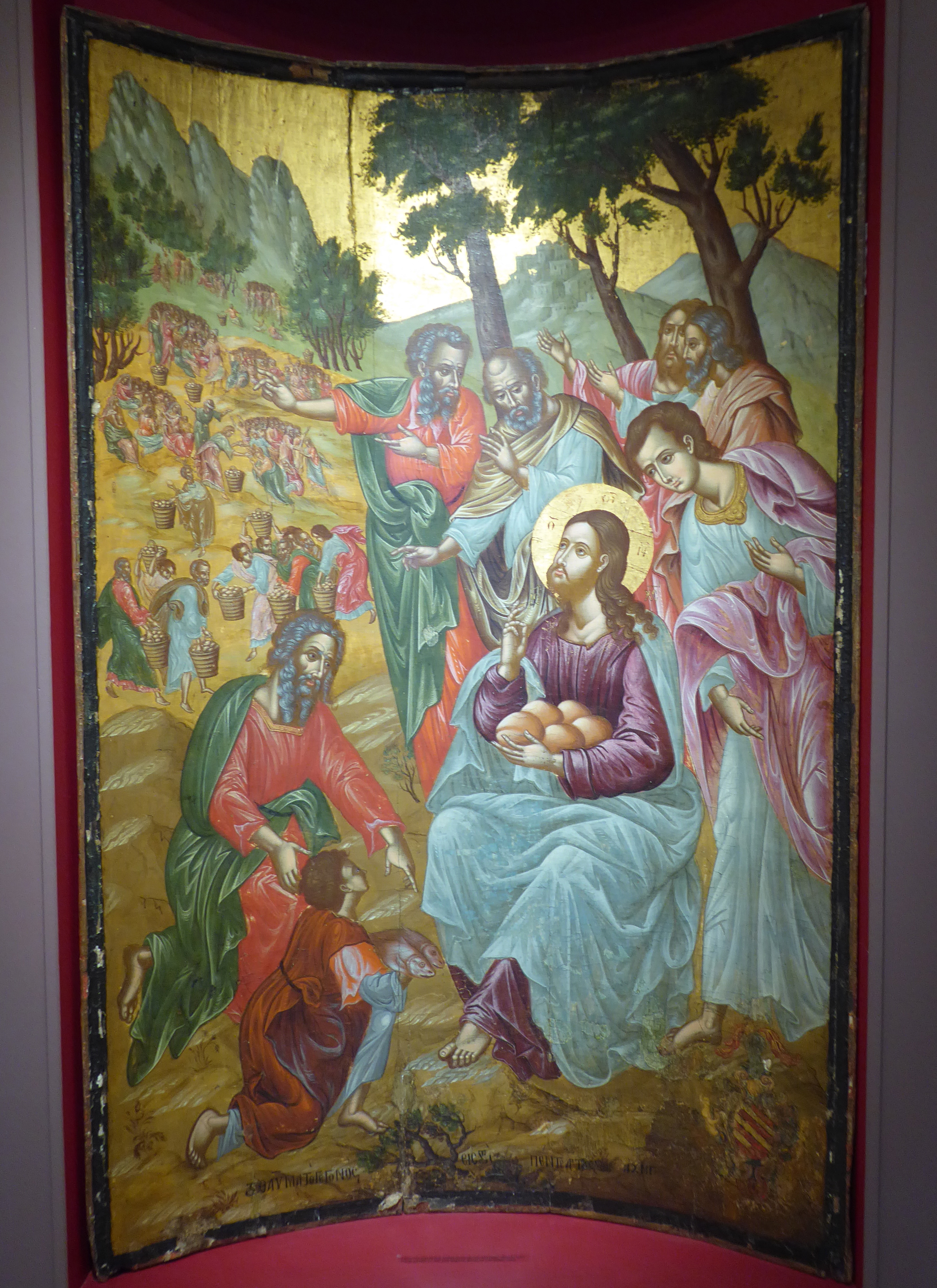
Jesus Feeding the Multitude

== Bibliography ==
- Hatzidakis, Manolis; Drakopoulou, Evgenia (1997). Έλληνες Ζωγράφοι μετά την Άλωση (1450-1830). Τόμος 2: Καβαλλάρος - Ψαθόπουλος [Greek Painters after the Fall of Constantinople (1450-1830). Volume 2: Kavallaros - Psathopoulos]. Athens: Center for Modern Greek Studies, National Research Foundation. hdl:10442/14088. ISBN 960-7916-00-X.
