= Saint Catherine of Alexandria (Palladas, Sinai) =

Painting by Ieremias Palladas

Saint Catherine
- Αγία Αικατερίνη (Greek), Caterina d'Alessandria (Italian)
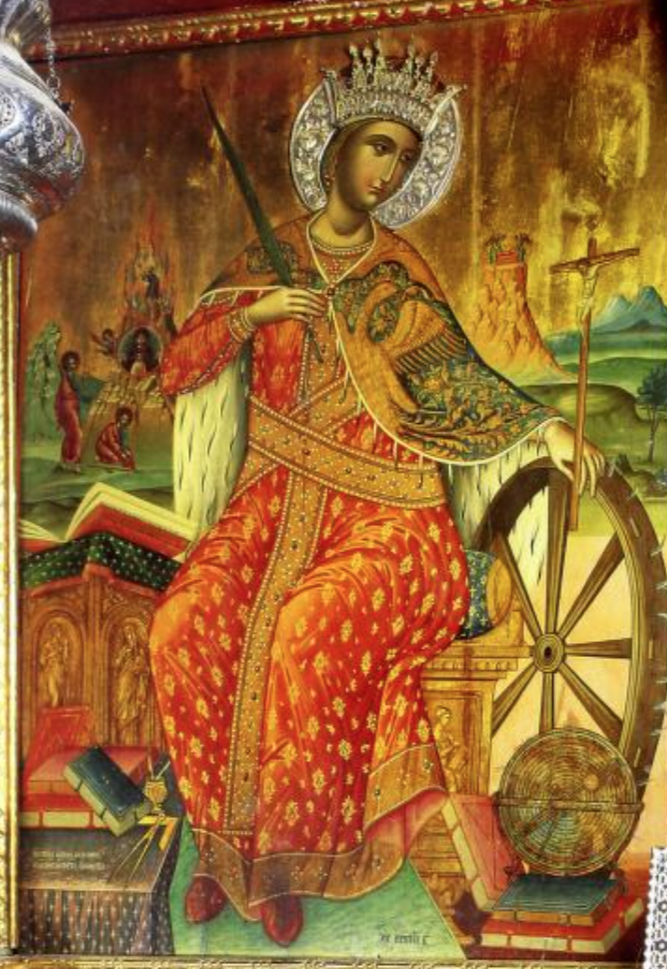
- Artist: Ieremias Palladas
- Year: c. 1612
- Medium: tempera on wood
- Movement: Late Cretan School
- Subject: Saint Catherine of Alexandria
- Dimensions: 122 cm × 86 cm (48 in × 34 in)
- Location: Saint Catherine's Monastery, Mount Sinai, Egypt
- Owner: Saint Catherine's Monastery

Catherine of Alexandria is a tempera painting created by Ieremias Palladas. Palladas was a monk associated with Saint Catherine's sacred monastery in Egypt also known as Mount Sinai. He was a painter and teacher. His nephew became the Patriarch of Alexandria. His name was Gerasimos Palladas. Ieremias was a Sinaitic monk because of his association with Saint Catherine's monastery on Mount Sinai. The monastery encloses the site where it is assumed by Christians that Moses saw the burning bush. Ieremias was one of the most influential figures of his time. The Patriarch of Jerusalem Nectarius wrote about the painter in his archives.

Saint Catherine was an educated woman and princess from Alexandria, Egypt. She was alive from 287 to 305. She died seven years before Constantine recognized the new Christian religion. She was tortured by Emperor Maxentius because she converted hundreds of people to the new Christian faith. She was almost put to death by a spiked wheel. She is often depicted in art as an educated woman with a spiked wheel. Palladas finished one of the most influential paintings of the figure for the iconostasis of Saint Catherine's Monastery in Mount Sinai, Egypt. It became the prototype for Catherine of Alexandria. During the same period, another Sinaitic monk named Theocharis Silvestros painted several versions of the prototype. Countless artists copied the work namely, Emmanuel Lambardos, Victor and Philotheos Skoufos.

== Description ==
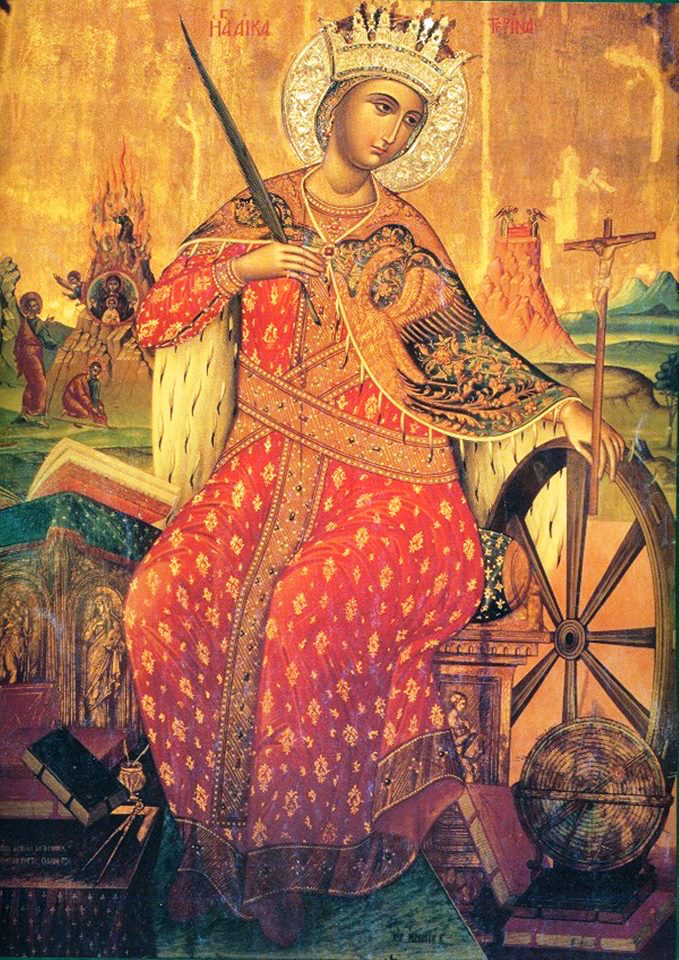
Saint Catherine Close up

The materials used were egg tempera on gold leaf and wood panel. The height is 158.7 cm (62.2 in) and the width is 117.8 cm (46.4 in). The painting is over 5 feet tall, it was completed in 1612. It was part of a large group of paintings completed for the iconostasis of Saint Catherine's Monastery in Mount Sinai, Egypt. The icon features Catherine of Alexandria. The princess sits in a position similar to Palladas's earlier work depicting Saint Catherine. The artist created an advanced version of his earlier work.

Palladas integrates Michael Damaskinos's Virgin of the Burning Bush in the middle ground. The artist clearly attempts to escape the traditional maniera greca and incorporates the prevalent Cretan style. The painting exhibits deeper space and enhanced three-dimensionality. The artist clearly superimposes Damaskinos's work in the background. The mountains are painted in the traditional Cretan style. The mountains are Jebel Mousa featuring Moses and Theotokos as the burning bush and Jebel Katrin with the tomb of Saint Catherine accompanied by two angels. The gilded background fits into the three-dimensional space. The artist also creates a natural scene with green valleys.

Palladas aimed to construct a figure with substance and dimensionality. He integrated academic themes in the foreground. Symbols of wisdom are present. Books, square and compasses, a gnomon, an inkwell with quills, and an astrolabe are all present. In her right hand, she holds the martyr's palm. Her left-hand rests on a spiked wheel. In the same hand, she also holds a cross. She looks at the cross indicating a connection with Jesus. Her stance is very similar to a painting by Venetian painter Lorenzo Lotto. His Saint Catherine resembles the pose of Palladas's work. Her head is shifted to our right. Her waist and legs are shifted towards our left.

She is enthroned and dressed in royal attire. The model was an elaborate Venetian garment. Her cape-like Pellegrina is draped over her dress. It follows the traditional Greek Italian Byzantine style where the stole is draped over her left arm. The cape-like garment also features two eagles. To our left, a book rests on an ornamented Venetian style lectern. Below the books, there is a Greek inscription:Αἰκατερίνα καὶ σοφὴ καὶ παρθένος, ἐκ δὲ ξίφους καὶ μάρτυς, ὢ καλὰ τρία (The three virtues of Catherine, wise, pure and martyred by the sword. His signature is also on the painting ΧΕΙΡ ΙΕΡΕΜΙΟΥ (by the hand of Jeremiah).

== Scientific Element ==
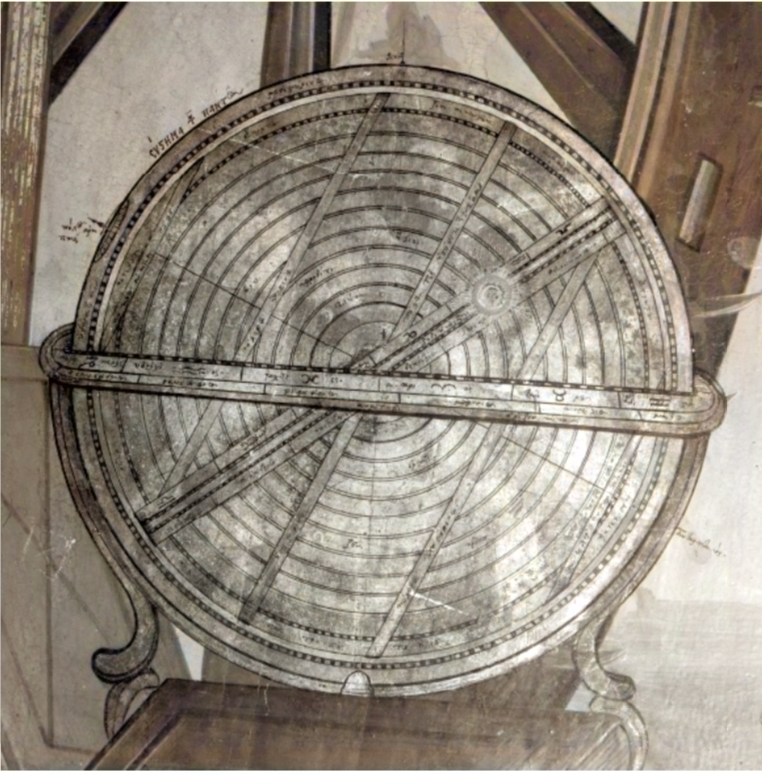
Astronomical Instrument

Countless researchers have studied the painting due to its scientific component. Historian Flora Vafea wrote a detailed analysis of the painting in her paper entitled The Astronomical Instruments in Saint Catherine’s iconography at the Holy Monastery of Sinai. The paper details the intricate scientific element within the painting. In front of the spiked wheel on top of two books, the painter adds an astronomical instrument. Palladas painted intricate details on the device. The astronomical instrument was the pictorial representation of astronomical scientific knowledge at that time.

The instrument was called System of the Universe (Σύστημα τοῦ Παντός). The instrument is a solid globe. It contains detailed inscriptions relating to astronomy. It offers five parallel segments the arctic circle, summer colure or (summer tropic), equator, winter colure or (winter tropic), and the antarctic circle. It also features two depictions of the zodiac. The circle turns either left or right. It features unequal divisions of zodiac signs. There are unequal divisions of ecliptic symbols longer at the center and shorter at the sides.

The celestial spheres are drawn from the Ptolemaic system. Earth is depicted as a blue sphere with circles of geographic coordinates. The line representing the axis of the Earth covers the entire instrument. The Earth casts a bluish shadow on the opposite side of the Sun, and the Moon turns its illuminated part towards the Sun. There are twelve more spheres. The spheres are named in Greek: Selene (moon), Hermes (Mercury), Aphrodite (Venus), Helios (Sun), Ares (Mars), Zeus (Jupiter), and Chronos (Saturn). They are also represented by unique symbols. Fixed stars are also present, they are painted as red and white spots. The depiction of the stars and the five circles on the celestial globes was observed by astronomers Geminus and Leontios Mechanikos.

The five parallel celestial circles outline six zones. A greek phrase is written on the outer circle outlining the different phases of the sun. The instrument features attributes of the sun written in Greek. In the north, it outlines: frigid, temperate, and torrid. In the south, it outlines: torrid, temperate and frigid. The painter also adds a zodiac circle on the slanted line of the instrument. It also features the symbols for Libra, Scorpio, Sagittarius, Capricorn, Aquarius and Pisces. The lines are separated by degrees. The instrument also features a calendar and a meridian ring. The instrument closely resembles an astrolabe. His contemporaries added an armillary sphere or a celestial globe in their versions of his painting.

== Gallery ==
Saint Catherine's Pose Lotto

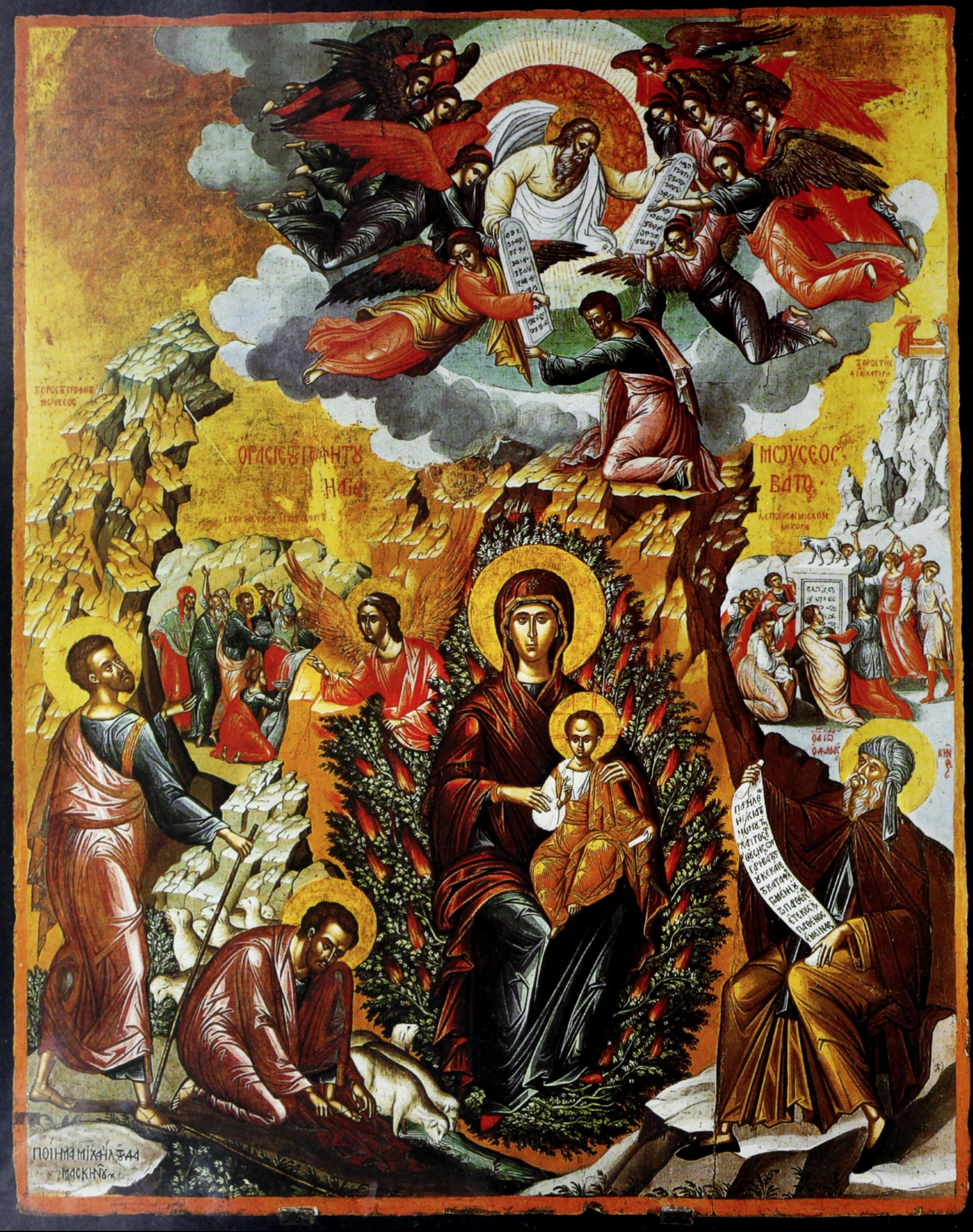
Virgin of the Burning Bush

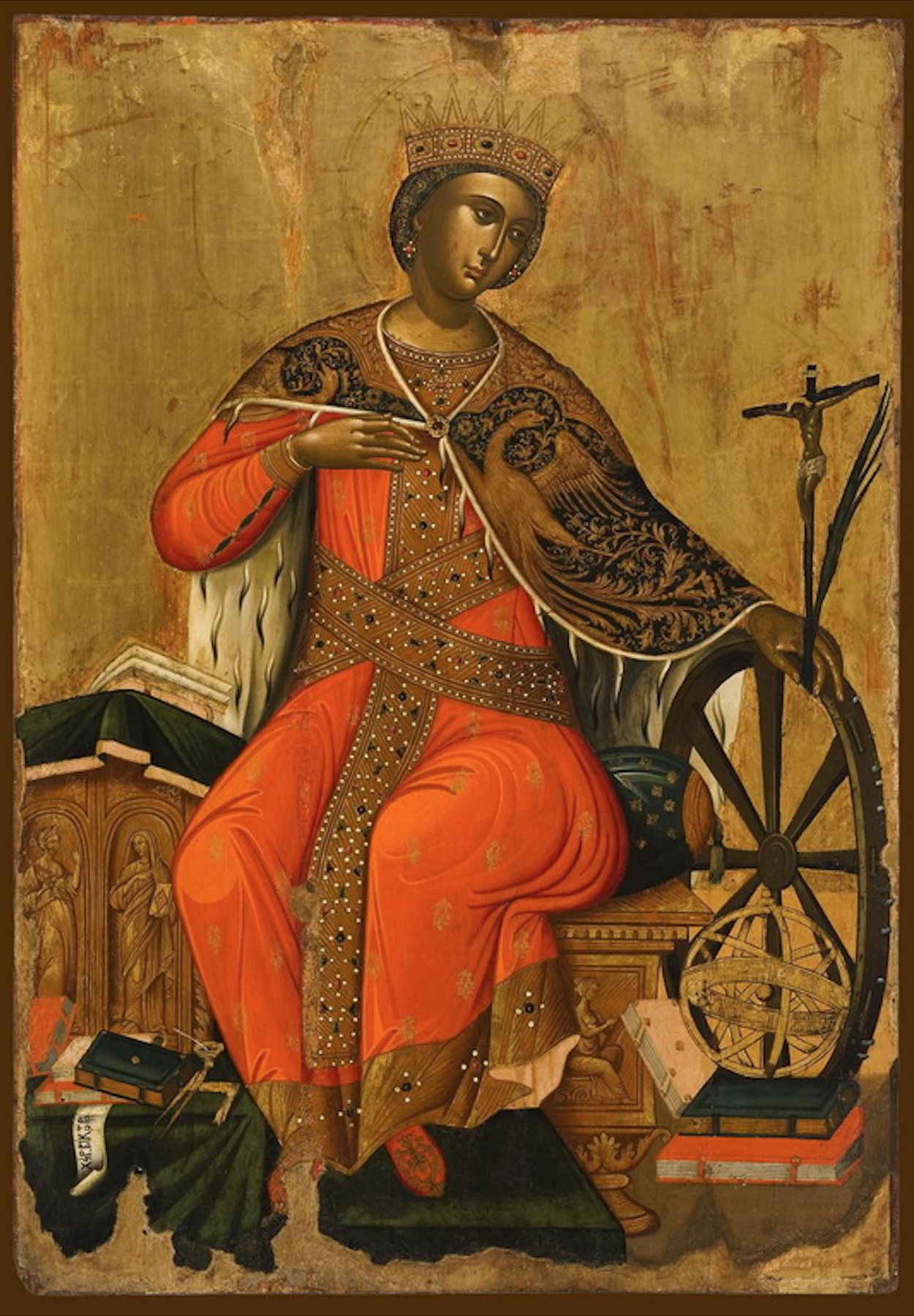
Victor Saint Catherine

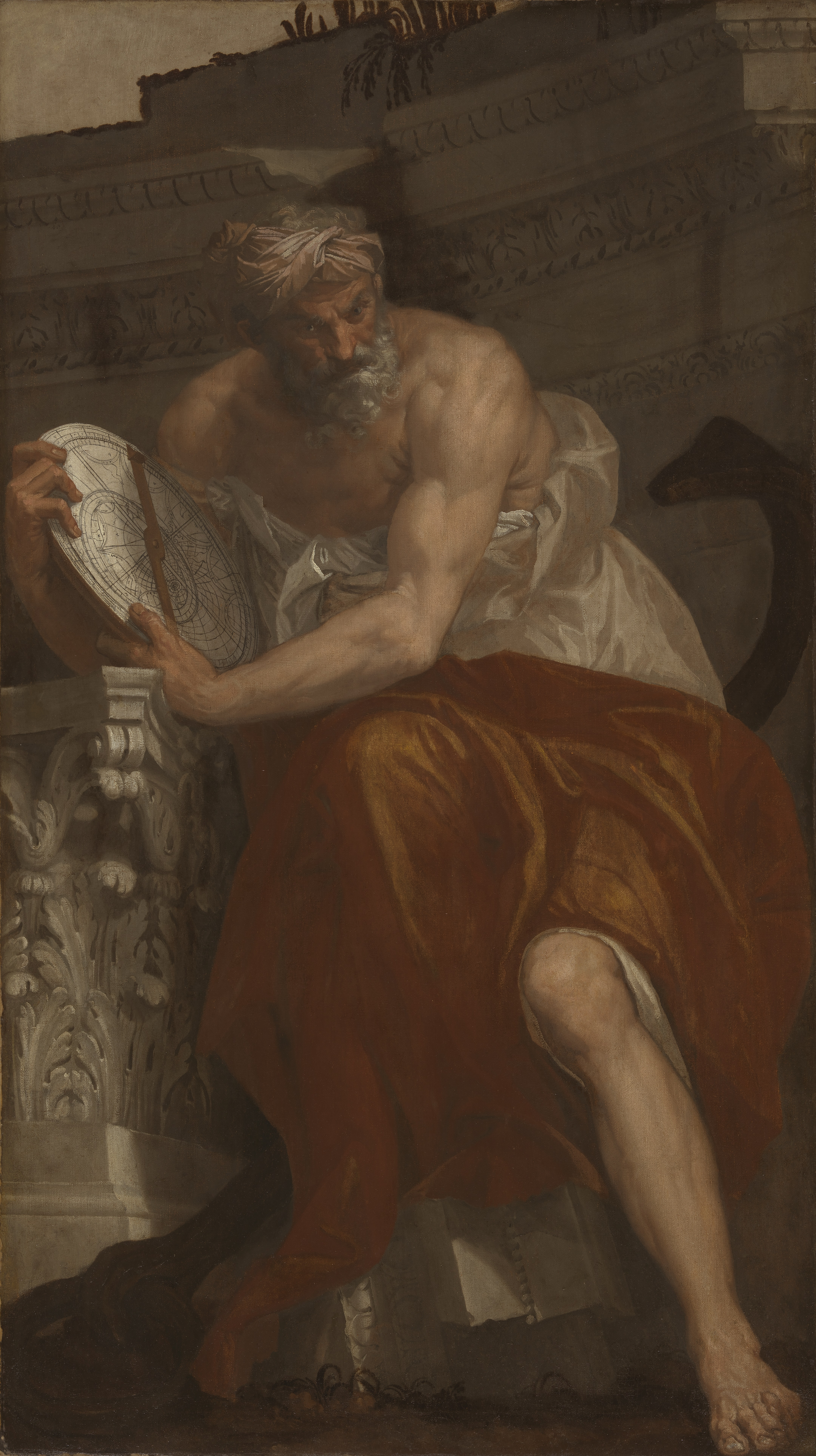
Ptolemy and Astrolabe

== See also ==
- Leonardo da Vinci
- Celestial sphere

== Bibliography ==
- Evans, Helen C. (2004). Saint Catherine's Monastery, Sinai, Egypt A Photographic Essay. New York, NY: Metropolitan Museum of Art in collaboration with Saint Catherine's Monastery, Sinai. ISBN 9781588391094.
