= Virgin of the Burning Bush (Damaskinos) =

Painting by Michael Damaskenos

- Η Καιόμενη Βάτος (Greek), Madonna Roveto Ardente (Italian)
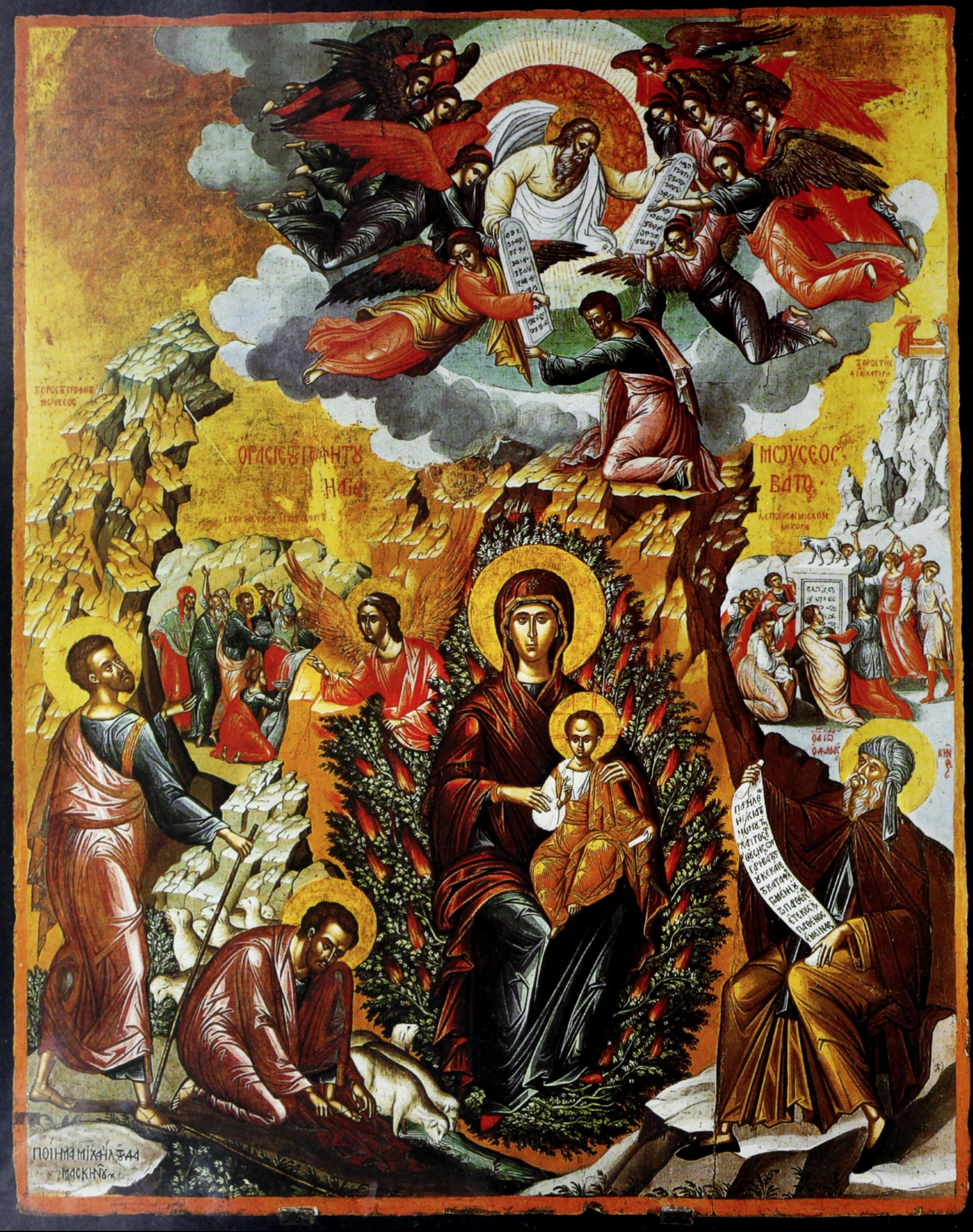
- Artist: Michael Damaskinos
- Year: c. 1586-1591
- Medium: tempera on wood
- Subject: Moses, Virgin Mary, Child Jesus, John of Damascus, and Saint Catherine with the Burning Bush.
- Dimensions: 111 cm × 89 cm (43.7 in × 34.4 in)
- Location: Monastery of Agia Aikaterini, Heraklion, Crete
- Owner: Collection of Saint Catherine's Monastery Mount Sinai, Egypt
- Website: Official Website

The Virgin of the Burning Bush was a painting made of egg tempera and gold leaf on a wood panel. The portable icon was signed by Greek painter Michael Damaskinos. Damaskinos has over 100 known works. He was a distinguished member of the Cretan school of painting. He was from Crete. His contemporaries included Georgios Klontzas and El Greco. Damaskinos spent over twenty years traveling all over Italy. He spent a significant time in Venice. He adopted Italian artistic mannerisms which he applied to his paintings.

Moses was a biblical figure who received Tablets of Stone inscribed with the Ten Commandments in Mount Sinai, Egypt as written in the Book of Exodus. In the biblical narrative, Moses was also appointed by Yahweh to lead the Israelites out of Egypt and into Canaan at the Burning Bush. Both themes are an integral part of Damaskinos's work. His painting is a rare depiction of the Virgin and Child with Moses. The painting served as an inspiration to Ieremias Palladas's painting of Saint Catherine. Palladas features some of Damaskinos's work in the background of his painting of the Egyptian martyr. Both works are a tribute to Catherine of Alexandria and Mount Sinai, Egypt. The Virgin of the Burning Bush is now in the Monastery of Agia Aikaterini in Heraklion, Crete.

== Description ==
The painting was created in the second half of the 16th century. The height of the painting is 43.7 in. (110.9 cm) and the width is 34 in. (86.4 cm). The material was tempera painting and gold leaf on wood panel. The icon is roughly the same size as Damaskinos's Adoration of the Kings. The painting stylistically resembles the Adoration of the Kings. The central figure in both paintings is against a mountain. The artist also crowds his figures in both works. The Virgin of the Burning Bush is a rare depiction of the Virgin and Child with Moses. Byzantine theologian John of Damascus wrote about the Burning Bush. He said the bush was an image of God's Mother, and as Moses was about to approach, God Said: Put off the shoes from thy feet, for the place whereon thou standest is holy ground.

The painting creates a visual story of Moses's encounters with the divine on Mount Sinai incorporating the writings of John of Damascus. To our left, Moses stands before the Burning Bush. An angel appears out of the flames, below is another image of Moses removing his sandals. In the center of the image, the Virgin and Child appear enthroned within the Burning Bush (Θεοτόκος ή Βάτις). In the lower right-hand corner John of Damascus holds a scroll. In the background, two scenes from Moses's life from the Book of Exodus are present. To the left of the mountain, Moses strikes the rock with his holy staff and a spring appears for the Israelites to drink. To the right of the mountain, the scene of the Golden calf is depicted. At the top of the image, God and angles are passing the tablets to Moses. The final scene is of angels bringing Saint Catherine's body to Jebel Katrina, one of the three peaks of Mount Sinai.

The painting follows the typical Damaskinos technique. His painting features the Italian renaissance cangiante. The Virgin is enthroned in the Burning Bush following the traditional hodegetria stance. The Burning Bush is depicted as receding into space. The figures in the foreground of Moses and John of Damascus promote three-dimensionality namely in the drapery folds. Moses is at the peak of the middle mountain above the Virgin Mary. Moses and the faces of the figures around him are facing the Virgin Mary. There are also two other mountains. All three mountains form a triangle They are painted in the traditional Cretan style. The artist clearly creates a visual distinction of spatial depth.

== Gallery ==
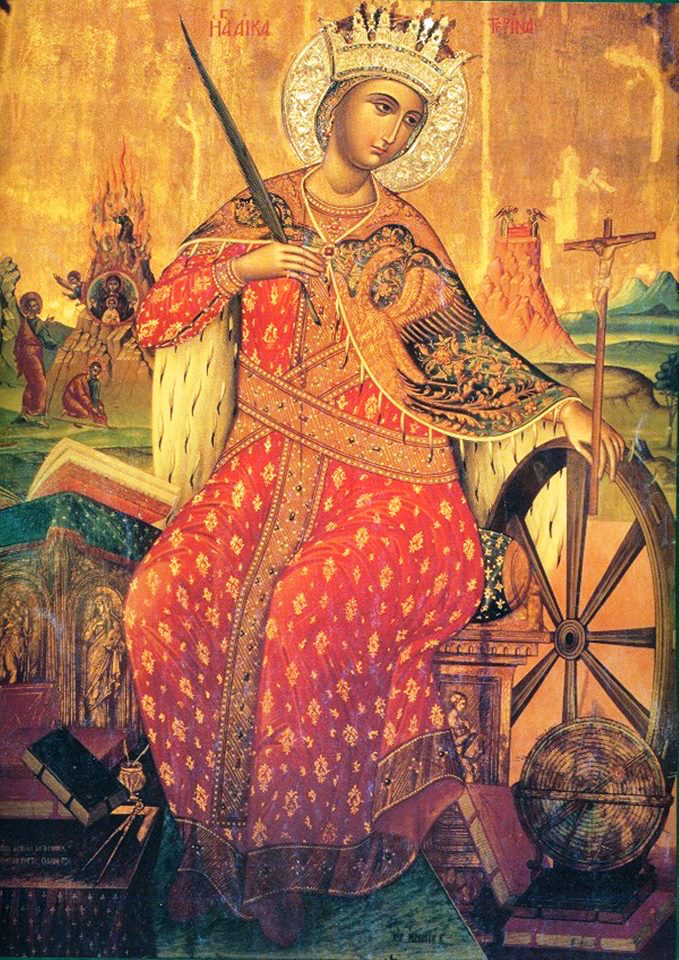
Burning Bush Background Palladas

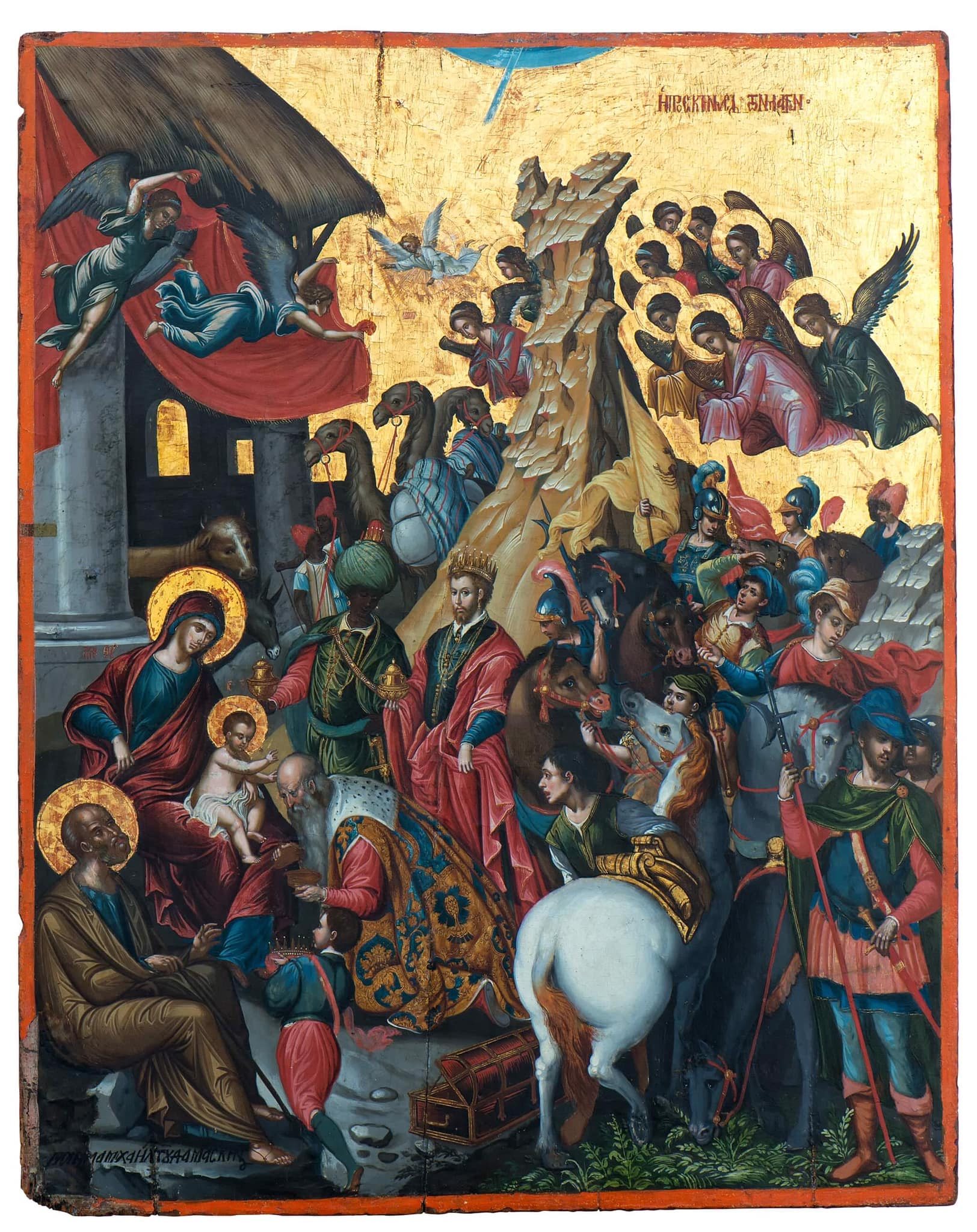
Adoration of the Kings
