= Modena Triptych =

Painting by El Greco

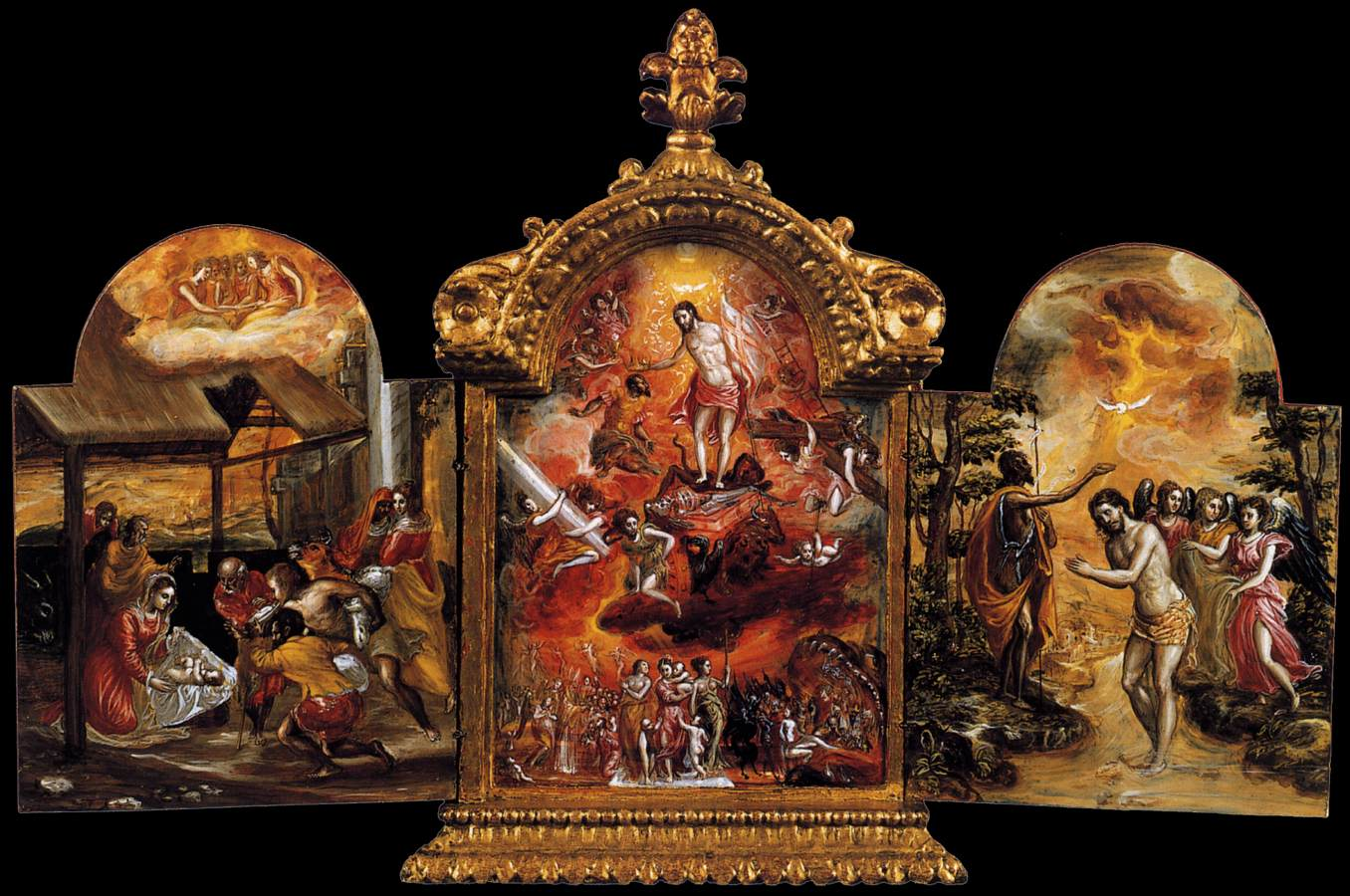
- Artist: El Greco
- Year: 1568
- Movement: Cretan School
- Location: Galleria Estense; Modena

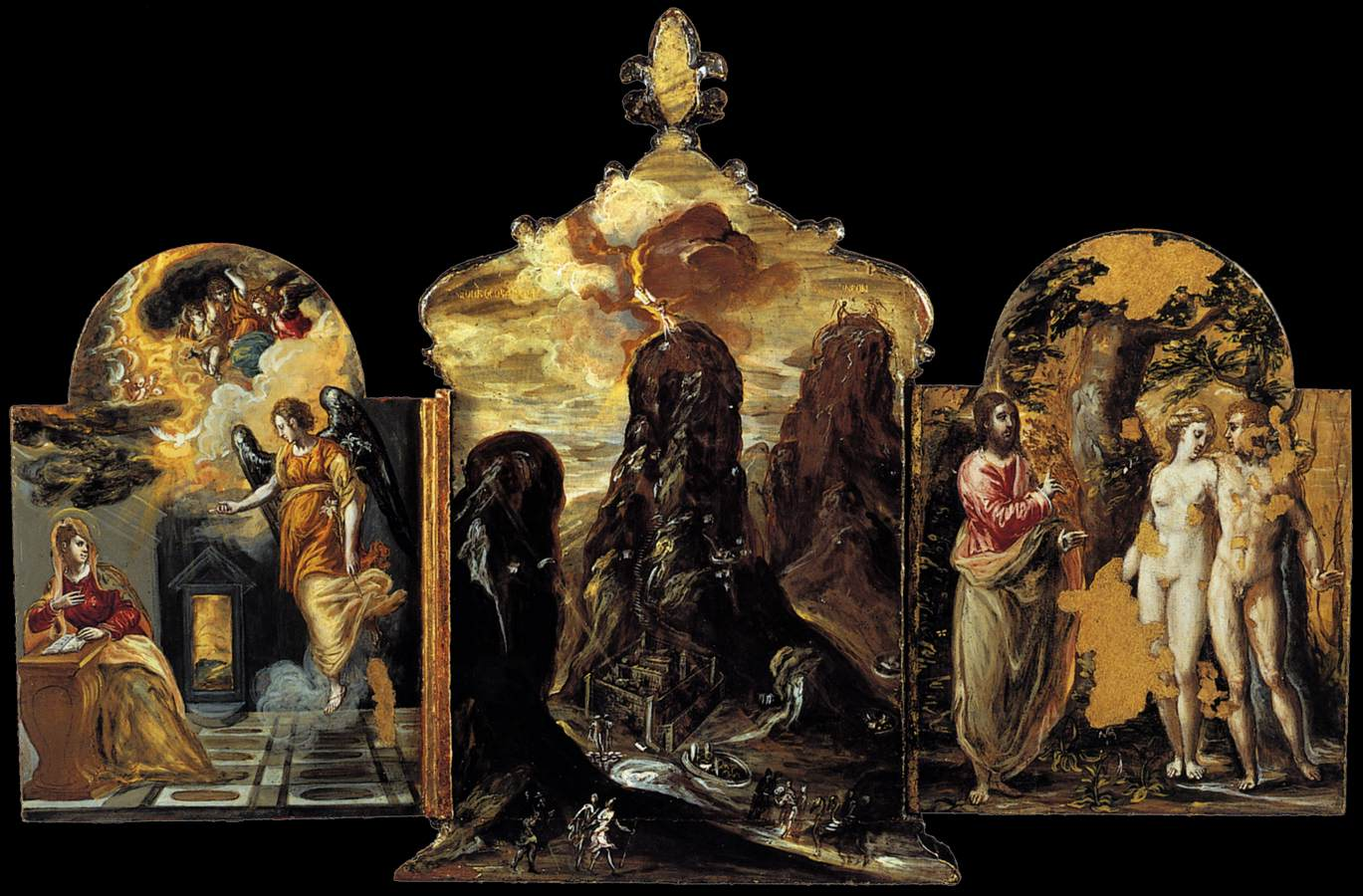
Back panels of the Modena Triptych

The Modena Triptych is 1568 triptych (three panel painting) by the artist El Greco, who was also known as Doménikos Theotokópoulos.

This portable altarpiece is painted on both sides and has an Italian Renaissance frame. The front depicts the Adoration of the Shepherds, a Christian knight being crowned by Christ in glory, and the Baptism of Jesus. The back panels show the Annunciation to Mary, Mount Sinai, and Adam and Eve. The back panel shows pilgrims on the way to the Saint Catherine's Monastery in Egypt as if on their way to Heaven.

== See also ==
- List of works by El Greco

== Bibliography ==
- Collins, Kristen M. (2006). Holy Image, Hallowed Ground: Icons from Sinai. Los Angeles: California: J. Paul Getty Museum. ISBN 9780892368563.
- Lopera, Jose Alvarez (1999). El Greco: Identity and Transformation. New York, NY: Skira. ISBN 8881184745.
