= Georgilas Maroulis =

17th-century Greek painter

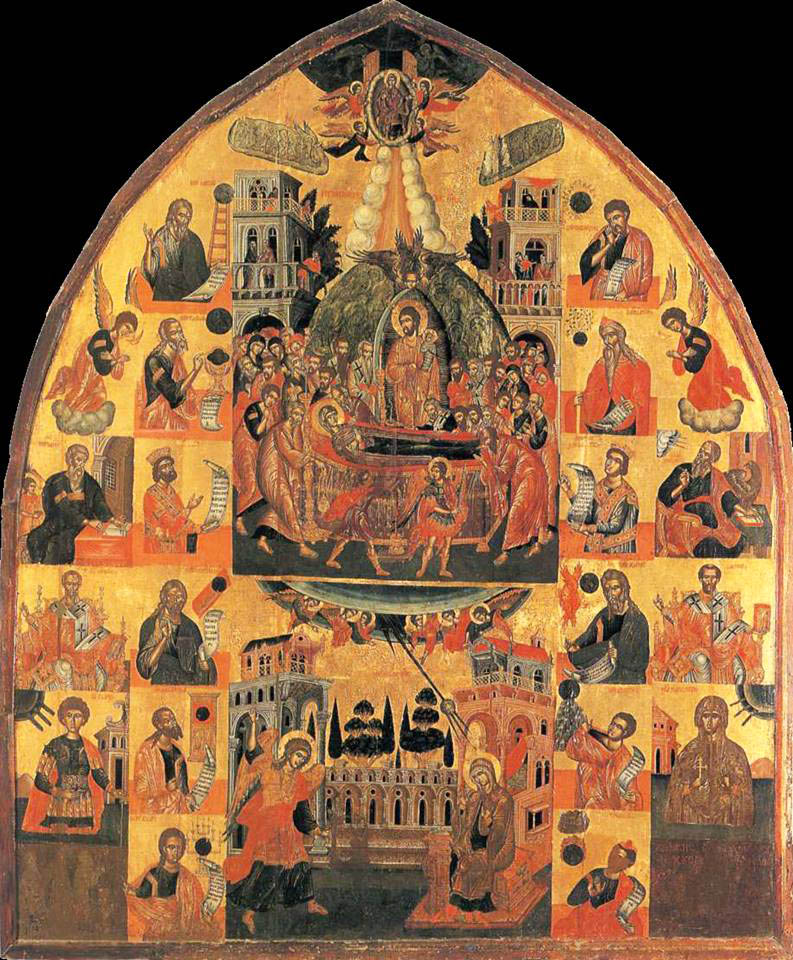
- The Dormition of the Virgin
- Born: 17th century Rethymno, Greece
- Died: 17th century Heraklion, Greece
- Known for: Iconography and hagiography
- Notable work: Dormition of the Virgin
- Movement: Cretan school

Georgilas Maroulis (Greek: Γεωργιλάς Μαρούλης η Μαρουλής) was a 17th-century Greek painter. He was a prominent member of the Cretan school, and was influenced by the works of Georgios Klontzas and Franghias Kavertzas. His only surviving work is the Dormition of the Virgin, the Annunciation with Prophets, and Saints. The piece is part of the collection of the Athens School of Fine Arts.

== History ==
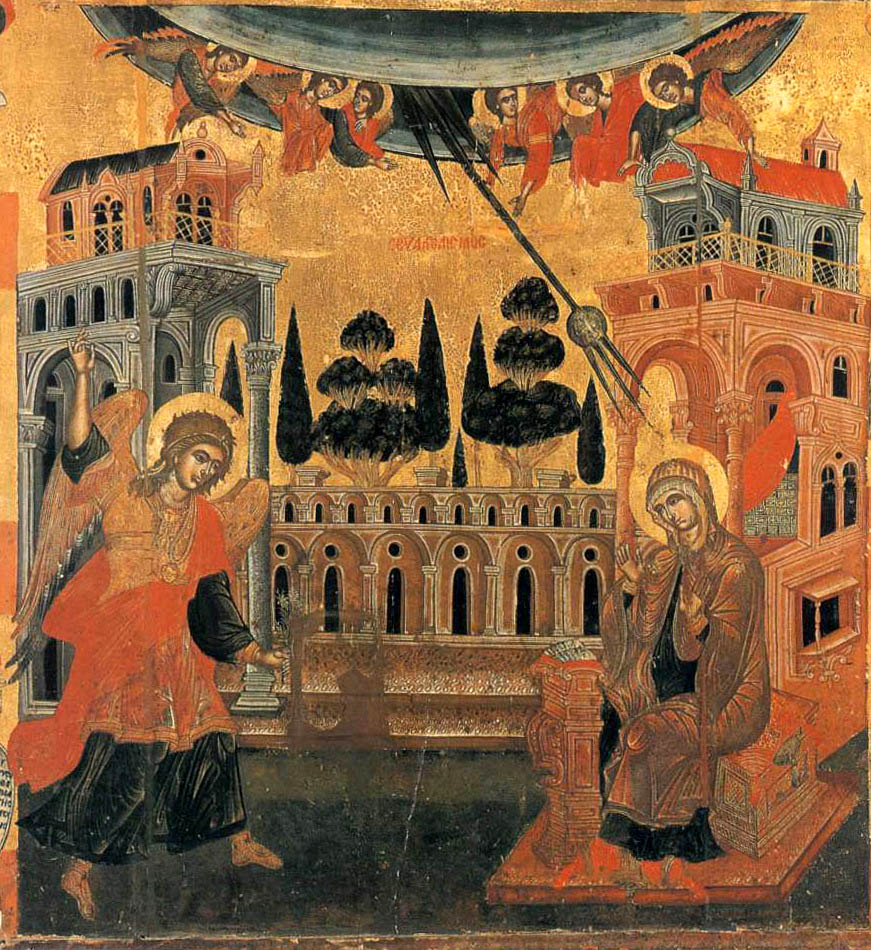
Detail of the Annunciation

He was born in Rethymno. His father's name was Apostolos. He had a workshop in Kastro, Rethymno. On December 22, 1635, he was in Chandax, where he agreed to paint the icon Dormition of the Virgin, the Annunciation with Prophets, and Saints. The contract stated that Maroulis had seven months to complete the work. The fee he charged was 250 Venetian lira. The painter added the gold trim and painted the entire piece. The contract also featured a penalty clause if the work was not finished on time.

The annunciation sequence is the typical Greek mannerism. Gabriel is communicating with Mary. He tells her she will conceive and bear a son through a virgin birth and become the mother of Jesus Christ. The atmosphere is covered with darkness a dark beam of light shines on the Virgin. The trees in the background are also colored dark. The Virgin is confused but the Angel Gabriel reassures her of her future fate.

== See also ==
- Leos Moskos
- Georgios Kortezas
