= Iakovos Moskos =

Greek painter

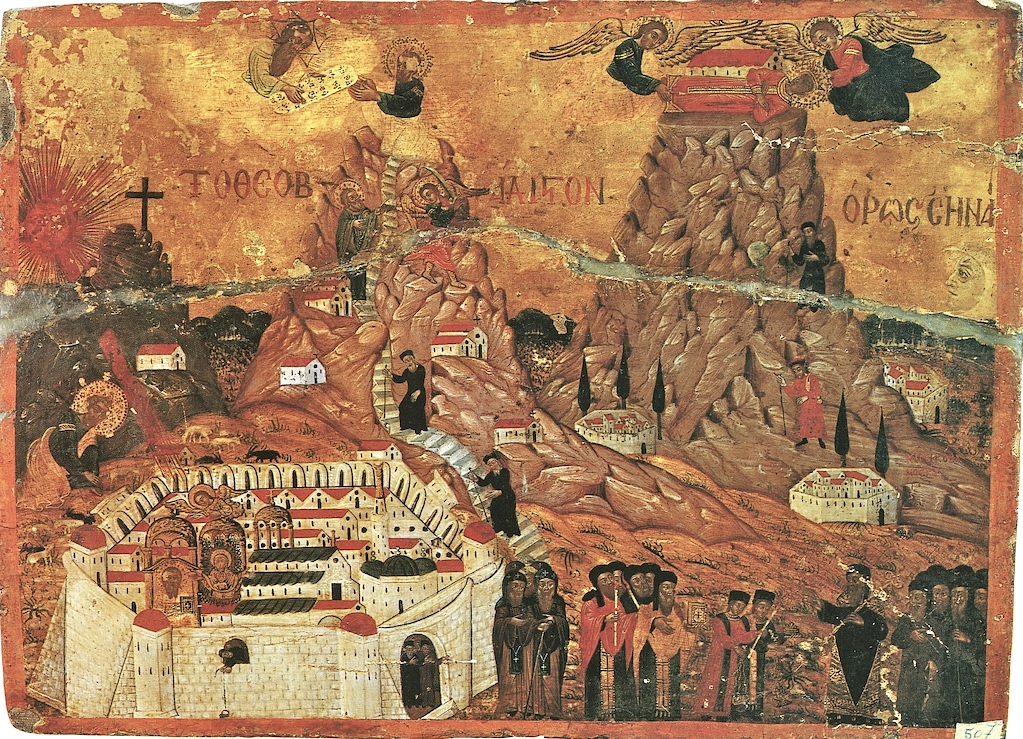
- Painting of the Mount Sinai
- Born: Late 1600s Astypalaia, Greece
- Died: 1700s Mount Sinai, Egypt
- Occupations: Painter, Monk
- Years active: 1700-1725
- Era: 18th Century
- Style: Maniera Greca

Iakovos Moskos or Moschos (Greek: Ιάκωβος Μόσκος/Μόσχος, 1600s – 1700s) was a Greek painter. He shared the same name as three other famous Greek painters Ioannis Moskos, Elias Moskos and Leos Moskos. He was affiliated with Saint Catherine's Monastery. Moskos painted in the typical Greek style. He was active during Greek Rococo and the end of the baroque period in Greek art. Ioannis Kornaros was exposed to his work while he was at the monastery. He was known for painting the Holy place of Mount Sinai the assumed location where Moses received the commandments. It is his most notable work. Eight of his paintings have survived.

== History ==
Iakovos Moskos was born in Astypalaia. He was active during the early part of the eighteenth century 1700-1725. He eventually traveled to Mount Sinai and become a monk. There is no documented familial relationship between the other artists named Moskos but it is a possibility. The name was extremely popular at the time due to their massive artistic output. Moskos's painting of Mount Sinai became an extremely popular symbol of the Sinaitic monastery. He painted a view of Mount Sinai with scenes from the monastic life. The painting is a historical symbol of Mount Sinai in the early 1700s. The image also features wildlife. The panel is made with gold leaf and tempera. It measures 28.7 x 39.1 x 1.9 cm. The inscription reads ΘΕΟΒΑΔΙCΤΟΝ ΟΡΩC CΗΝΑ (God-Trodden Mount of Sinai) The painting is at the monastery.

== See also ==
- Elias Moskos

== Bibliography ==
- Hatzidakis, Manolis; Drakopoulou, Evgenia (1997). Έλληνες Ζωγράφοι μετά την Άλωση (1450-1830). Τόμος 2: Καβαλλάρος - Ψαθόπουλος [Greek Painters after the Fall of Constantinople (1450-1830). Volume 2: Kavallaros - Psathopoulos]. Athens: Center for Modern Greek Studies, National Research Foundation. hdl:10442/14088. ISBN 960-7916-00-X.
