= Ieremias Palladas =

Greek painter

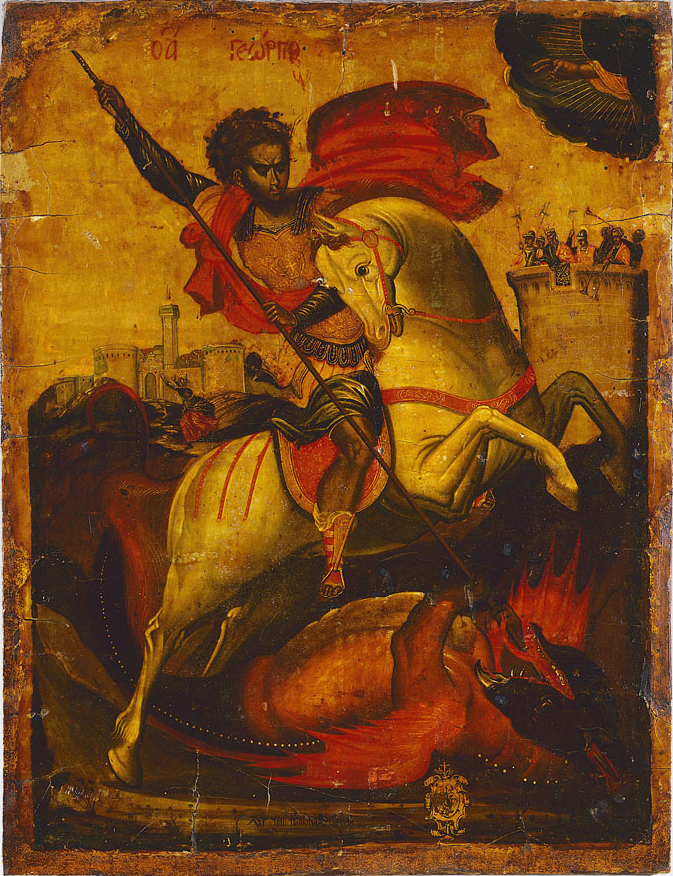
- Saint George
- Born: 1580-1592; Heraklion, Greece
- Died: 1659; Heraklion, Greece
- Known for: Iconography and hagiography
- Movement: Cretan school

Ieremias Palladas (Greek: Ιερεμίας Παλλαδάς; 1580–1592 – 1659), also known as Pouladas (Greek: Πουλαδάς), or Ieremia Pallada, was a Greek Renaissance painter. He was a clergyman, painter, and educator. He was affiliated with Saint Catherine's Monastery in Mount Sinai, Egypt. He is one of the most notable Greek painters of the 17th century. His family consisted of clergy and painters. His nephew was Patriarch of Alexandria Gerasimos Palladas. His work was influenced by Nikolaos Tzafouris and Angelos Akotantos. Georgios Klontzas and Emmanuel Lambardos were active in Crete around the same period. Palladas influenced the works of Theocharis Silvestros, Iakovos Moskos, Ioannis Kornaros and Philotheos Skoufos. According to the Institute of Neohellenic Research, twenty-four of his works survived. His specialty was painting crosses for the iconostasis or templo. Most of his works are in Egypt.

== History ==
Ieremias was born in Chandaka now Heraklion. His father's name was Stephanos. His family was very famous. He came from a long line of priests and painters. His father Stephanos Palladas was a priest. His brother Theodore Palladas was a high priest in Heraklion. His other brother Giorgios Palladas was a deacon and painter. Ieremias was a monk affiliated with Saint Catherine's Monastery in Egypt. His nephew Gerasimos Palladas was the Patriarch of Alexandria between 1688 and 1710. Ieremias specialized in painting crosses and other icons for the iconostasis (templo). His work influenced countless artists.

According to records of the Church of the Holy Sepulchre in Jerusalem, he created a cross for the iconostasis (templo) in 1608. The work was paid for by the people of Crete and recorded by the Dositheos II of Jerusalem. In 1612, he painted a group of icons for Saint Catherine's Monastery in Mount Sinai Egypt, again they were specifically for the iconostasis (templo). Ieremias was also a famous teacher. He taught reading, writing, and painting. Famous Greek painter Andreas Pavias also taught reading, writing, and painting. According to Venetian archives, one of Ieremias's students was Filippos Perkoulianos. He signed a five-year contract. The contract stipulated Filippos had to travel to his workshop every day. Another one of his students was Papa-Savvas Negrinis.

Heraklion featured a church that was a dependency of the main church of Saint Catherine's Monastery in Mount Sinai, Egypt. According to published documents, he completed the crosses for the church of Trimartiri and Saint Catherine of Sinai in Heraklion. The second was the dependency of the main church of Saint Catherine's Monastery in Egypt. Both works were also for the iconostasis (templo) and completed before 1633. One of his contemporaries Theocharis Silvestros was contacted by the Patriarch Gerasimus I of Alexandria to create a cross resembling the work of Palladas.

According to another record on October 14, 1639, Palladas painted a cross for the Basilica of the Nativity in Bethlehem. The painting featured the Virgin and the beheading of John the Baptist. On April 26, 1645, he is mentioned in a document with famous Greek painter Franghias Kavertzas. Palladas died before 1659–60. His life was recorded by Patriarch of Jerusalem Nectarius. He was also from Crete. He wrote a wonderful history about Palladas in his Holy History.

According to Nectarius, Palladas was a faithful monk affiliated with Saint Catherine's Monastery in Egypt. He was a very famous artist. His work was very important among official ecclesiastical circles. Many artists copied his work. Palladas was buried in Saint Catherine's Monastery in Heraklion. On May 2, 1668, his student famous painter Papa-Savvas Negrini also requested to be buried next to his teacher at the outpost dependency Saint Catherine of Sinai in Heraklion.

== Gallery ==
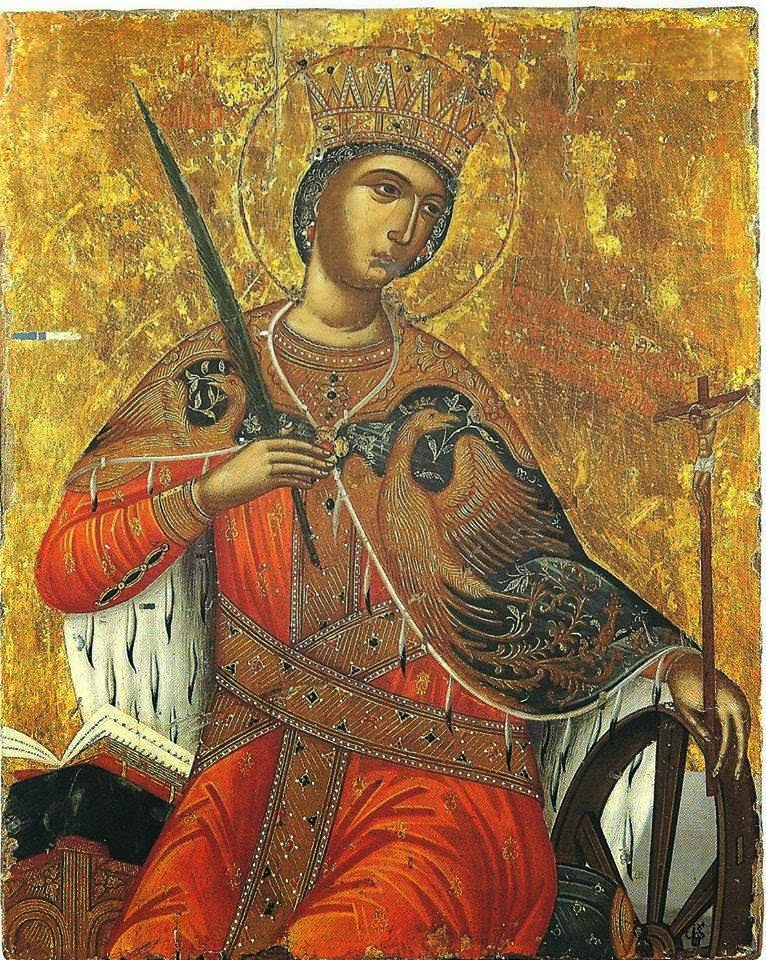
Saint Catherine of Alexandria

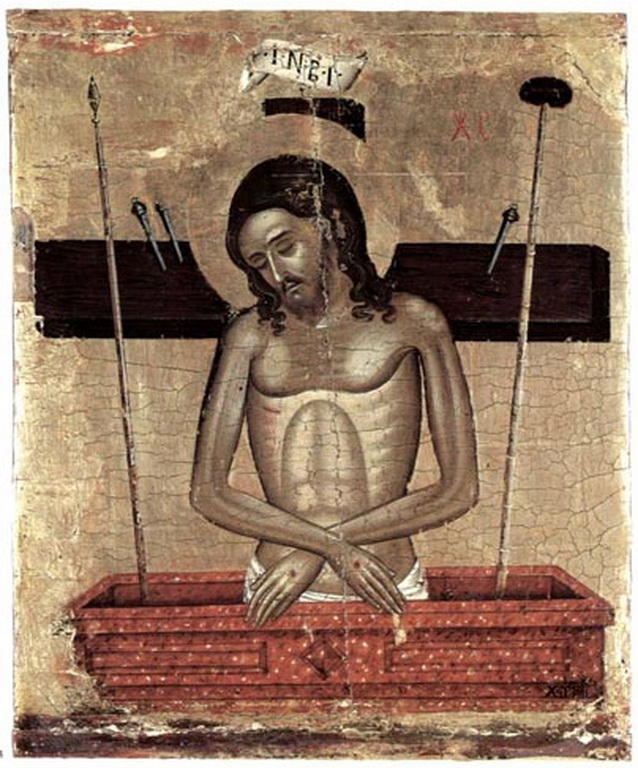
Christ in the Sarcophagus

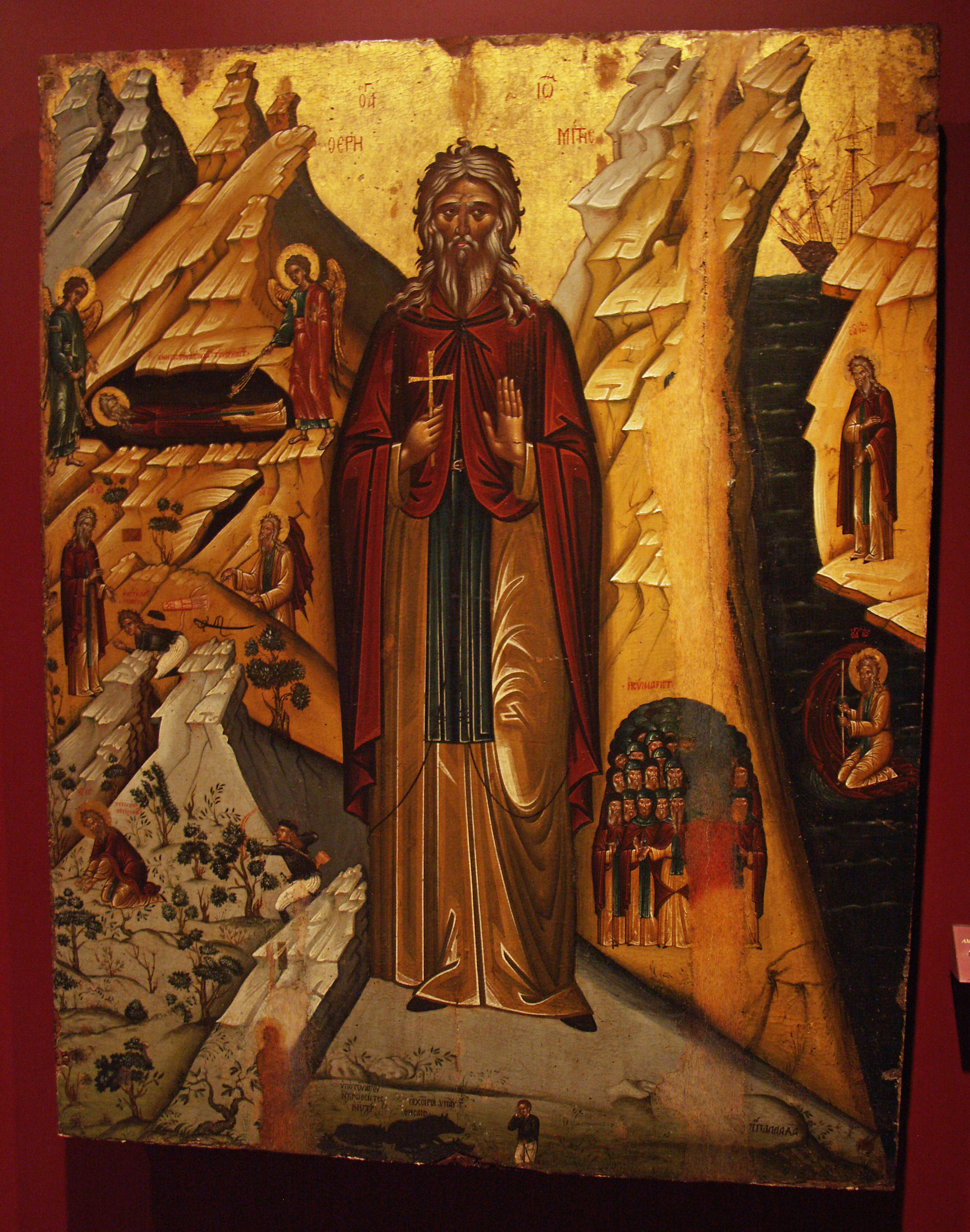
Saint John the hermit

== Notable works ==
- Nine Icons of the iconostasis Saint Catherine's Monastery, Mount Sinai, Egypt
- Three Hierarchs, Saint George's Monastery, Cairo, Egypt
- Saint Andrew, Museum of Pavlos and Alexandra Kanellopoulou, Athens, Greece
- Saint Catherine of Alexandria, Sinaitic Church of Saint Matthew, Heraklion, Greece
- Christ Pantocrator, Panagia tou Kastrou, Rhodes, Greece

== See also ==
- Neilos
- Georgilas Maroulis

== Bibliography ==
- Hatzidakis, Manolis (1987). Έλληνες Ζωγράφοι μετά την Άλωση (1450-1830). Τόμος 1: Αβέρκιος - Ιωσήφ [Greek Painters after the Fall of Constantinople (1450-1830). Volume 1: Averkios - Iosif]. Athens: Center for Modern Greek Studies, National Research Foundation. hdl:10442/14844. ISBN 960-7916-01-8.
- Hatzidakis, Manolis; Drakopoulou, Evgenia (1997). Έλληνες Ζωγράφοι μετά την Άλωση (1450-1830). Τόμος 2: Καβαλλάρος - Ψαθόπουλος [Greek Painters after the Fall of Constantinople (1450-1830). Volume 2: Kavallaros - Psathopoulos]. Athens: Center for Modern Greek Studies, National Research Foundation. hdl:10442/14088. ISBN 960-7916-00-X.
- Drakopoulou, Evgenia (2010). Έλληνες Ζωγράφοι μετά την Άλωση (1450–1830). Τόμος 3: Αβέρκιος - Ιωσήφ [Greek Painters after the Fall of Constantinople (1450–1830). Volume 3: Averkios - Joseph]. Athens: Center for Modern Greek Studies, National Research Foundation. ISBN 978-960-7916-94-5.
