= Theocharis Silvestros =

Greek painter (died after 1638)

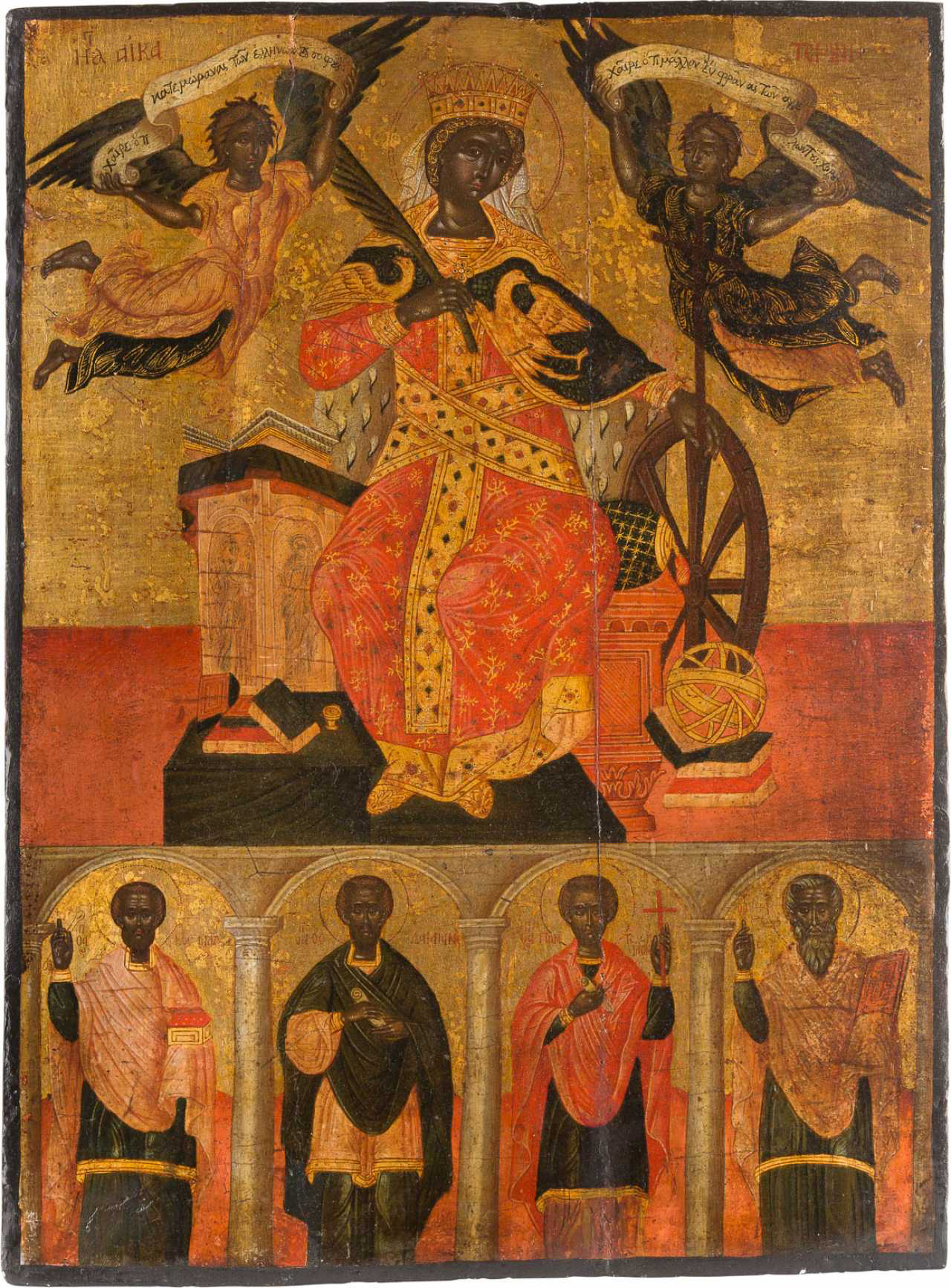
- Saint Catherine and the Anargyri
- Born: 17th century Heraklion, Greece
- Died: After 1638; Heraklion, Greece
- Known for: Painting
- Notable work: Saint Catherine
- Movement: Cretan school

Theocharis Silvestros (Greek: Θεοχάρης Σίλβεστρος; died after 1638) was a Greek Baroque painter. He was a monk affiliated with Saint Catherine's Monastery, Mount Sinai, Egypt. He was also active in Heraklion Crete. He was influenced by famous painters Emmanuel Lambardos and Ieremias Palladas. Theocharis was a renowned painter of the Cretan school. He influenced countless Greek painters. He was active during the same period as Philotheos Skoufos and Franghias Kavertzas. His most notable works are of Catherine of Alexandria. Most of his remaining works are associated with Saint Catherine's Monastery. He was a Sinaitic monk.

== History ==
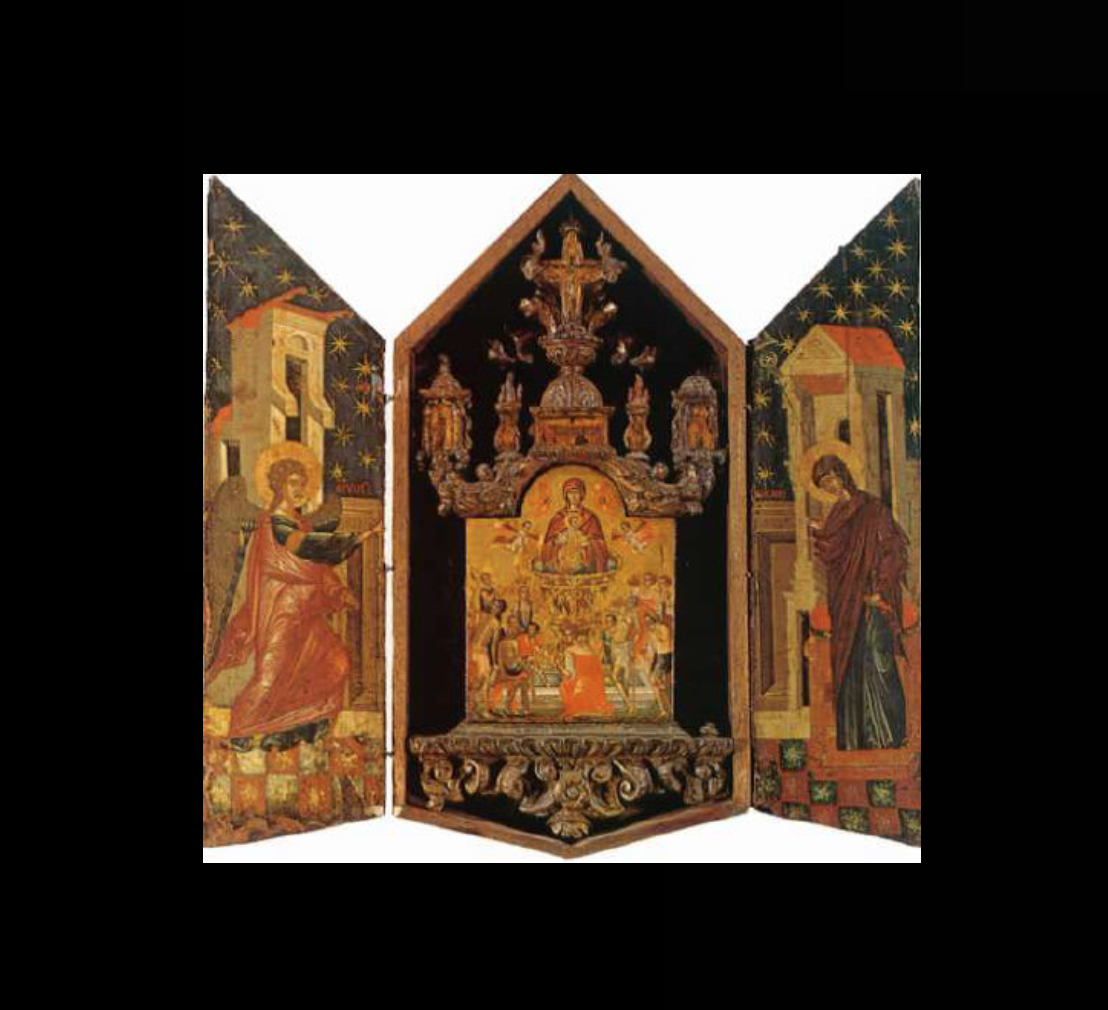
Triptych

Silvestros was born in Chandaka Heraklion. He was a monk affiliated with the famous religious institution Saint Catherine's Monastery in Egypt. There was a Saint Catherine's Monastery in Heraklion. The monastery was a dependency of the main church of Saint Catherine's Monastery in Mount Sinai, Egypt. Silvestros was active during the first fifty years of the 17th century. Not much is known about his personal life. He is mentioned in several historical documents.

The first historical reference was documented in 1633. His representative in Heraklion was contacted by the Patriarch of Alexandria Gerasimus I. He was hired to paint a wooden cross. His most notable works were copies of other masters namely Ieremias Palladas. The cross resembled Palladas’s work. He may have been affiliated with his workshop. Silvestros also copied the works of Emmanuel Lampardos.

According to a signature from the church of the Holy Cross in Kalafati, he was a priest at the church in 1635. It was located in the ancient city of Chandaka now known as Heraklion. In 1638, he was a witness in a notarial deed. According to the Institute of Neohellenic Research, eight of his works survive. Three of his notable works are of Saint Catherine.

== See also ==
- Bernardino Luini

== Bibliography ==
- Hatzidakis, Manolis (1987). Greek painters after the fall (1450-1830) Volume A. Athens, GR: Center for Modern Greek Studies E.I.E.
- Hatzidakis, Manolis & Drakopoulou, Eugenia (1997). Greek painters after the fall (1450-1830) Volume B. Athens, GR: Center for Modern Greek Studies E.I.E.
- Drakopoulou, Eugenia (2010). Greek painters after the fall (1450-1830) Volume C. Athens, GR: Center for Modern Greek Studies E.I.E.
