= Triptych of the Last Judgement (Klontzas) =

Painting by Georgios Klontzas

- Τρίπτυχο Δευτέρα Παρουσία (Greek), Il Giudizio Universale (Italian)
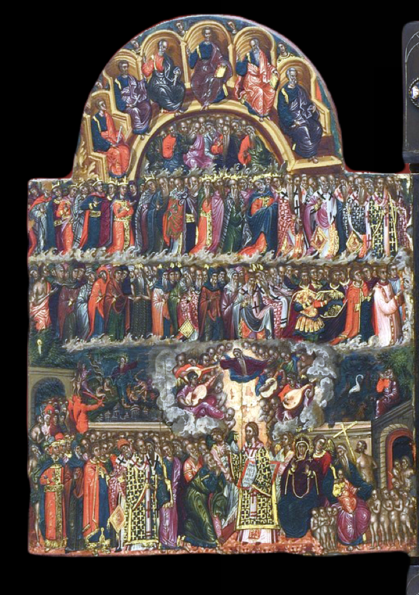
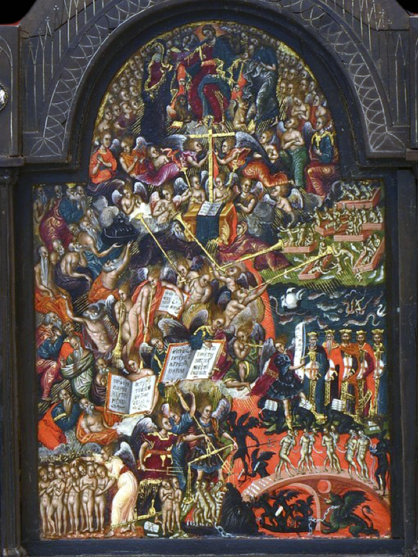
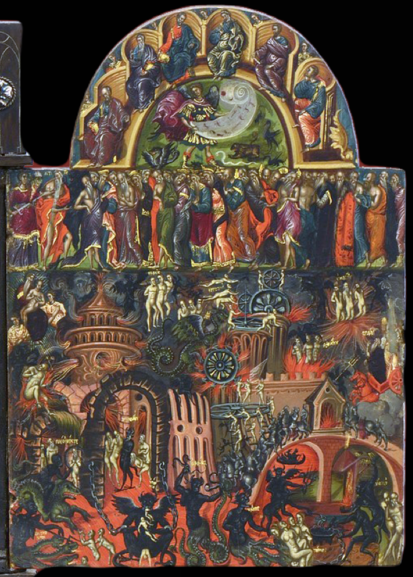
- Artist: Georgios Klontzas
- Year: c. 1560-1608
- Medium: gothic wood frame, egg tempera, gold leaf on wood
- Movement: Cretan School
- Subject: The Last Judgement
- Dimensions: 25.5 cm × 61 cm (10 in × 24 in)
- Location: Collection of Marianna Latsis; Athens, Greece
- Owner: Marianna Latsis

Triptych of the Last Judgement is a tempera-painted triptych created by Cretan Renaissance painter Georgios Klontzas. Klontzas was active in Crete during the later part of the 16th century. El Greco was active around the same period and was also from Crete. Klontzas was hired to assess his work. Klontzas completed tempera paintings, triptychs, and illuminated manuscripts. His existing catalog comprises over fifty-four pieces of his art. Klontzas frequently painted the theme of the Last Judgment. Some of his well-known works include The Last Judgement Triptych (Klontzas) and The Last Judgment (Klontzas). The Vatican owns Triptych of the Just in Glory also created by Klontzas which also features the Last Judgment.

The Second Coming or the Last Judgement is a common theme in Christian Art. The event sometimes referred to as the Second Advent or the Parousia is the Christian idea that Jesus will return to Earth after his ascension to heaven (which is said to have occurred about two thousand years ago). People of every country will be judged some will go to heaven others to hell. This triptych is a pictorial representation of that event. Greek and Italian Byzantine artists adopted the theme. The most popular work following the theme was painted in the Sistine Chapel in Vatican City by Michelangelo entitled The Last Judgment (Michelangelo). Works influenced by Klontzas completed during the Cretan Renaissance include: In Thee Rejoiceth (Poulakis), The Last Judgment (Kavertzas), and The Last Judgment (Moskos). The Triptych of the Last Judgement was also referred to as the Yorkshire Triptych which was owned by a private collector in London, England before being purchased by the Greek ship owner Marianna Latsis. The work of art belongs to the Collection of Marianna Latsis the collection also owns The Last Judgment (Moskos). The works of art are frequently exhibited all over the world.

== Description ==
The three panels were painted with tempera paint on gold leaf and the wood panels were attached to a gothic style frame sometime in the 1800s. The width of the three panels is 61 cm (24 in) and the height is 25.5 cm (10 in). The work features the Second Coming, going from our left to right. The left panel features six apostles and is separated by horizontal zones. The highest level of the panel represents the exalted hierarchy. The high priests (archbishops), prophets, kings, queens, monks, martyrs, holy women, and military saints are all represented. The theme is called the dance of the righteous and the figures are densely arranged. In the lower portion of the same panel, the entrance to paradise is depicted in the form of a walled enclosure with two entrances. One entrance is for the saints and the other is for the naked innocent souls both groups lead to Jesus Christ who is depicted as a High Priest. Christ is in the center of the panel along with two angels and deacons receiving Apostle Peter. The Virgin Mary is behind Jesus along with Abraham holding Lazarus following the story Rich man and Lazarus. Close to the same group the Penitent thief is naked holding a cross. Directly above Jesus, God and heaven are surrounded by musical angels enveloped in clouds. On the same horizontal plane Old Testament scenes are depicted such as Genesis, Exodus, and the story of Cain and Abel.

In the central panel, in the upper portion, Jesus is flanked by the Virgin Mary and St. John the Baptist in the traditional Deisis. Jesus is surrounded by two cherubs and the four apocalyptic evangelical symbols. Below the triumphant scene is the preparation of the Throne. The Throne or Holy Table features an open gospel, while behind it two winged angels raise the cross. At the base of the Holy Table, Adam and Eve appear clothed with their hands covered paying homage to the Second Coming. Similar figures appear in the central panel of Klontzas' The Last Judgement Triptych (Klontzas). On the left, Old Testament figures are presented. Noah holds an object depicting Noah's Ark. To the right, a small section depicts the rising of the dead. Below the cross alter system angels play brass instruments announcing the Second Coming and raising the dead. Angels hold open books with inscriptions from various gospel passages addressing either the blessed or the damned. The Archangel Michael appears with two assistant angels before the bridge to Hell in the lowest portion of the middle panel participating in his traditional role as the figure holding the scale. The event is called psychostasis. Michael holds the scale of justice judging the souls while demons try to add sins to the scale. Innocent souls are led by an angel into heaven to the left while sinful souls are guided over the bridge by demons of Hell on the right. Above the bridge appear the five earthly kings. Below the bridge of the damned a boat full of demons appears dragged by a dragon-like beast with a chain around its neck. The panel is completed by the personification of the sea as a woman on a sea beast.

Finally, on the third and final panel depicting hell to our right, the other six apostles appear. Below the apostles are clergy, and nobles. An angel appears holding a massive scroll with symbols of the zodiac while he is looking down. Abraham appears with Lazarus in the same place he appears on the panel in The Last Judgement Triptych (Klontzas). He is sitting atop a large Renaissance building as hot smoke escapes the building. The entire lower portion of the panel is occupied by Hell. The doorway to Hell leads to burning rooms. Torture devices (wheels with blades) and burning furnaces surround the high-walled enclosure. Demons subject sinners to horrendous torture and an arched bridge is occupied by demonic creatures and tormented souls of the dead. In the foreground, demons are ravishing humans and mixed-breed demons who prey on sinners. The work was signed on the lower right panel ΥΕΙΡ ΓΕΩΡΓΙΟΥ ΚΛΟΝΤΖΑ.

== Gallery ==
=== Similar works ===
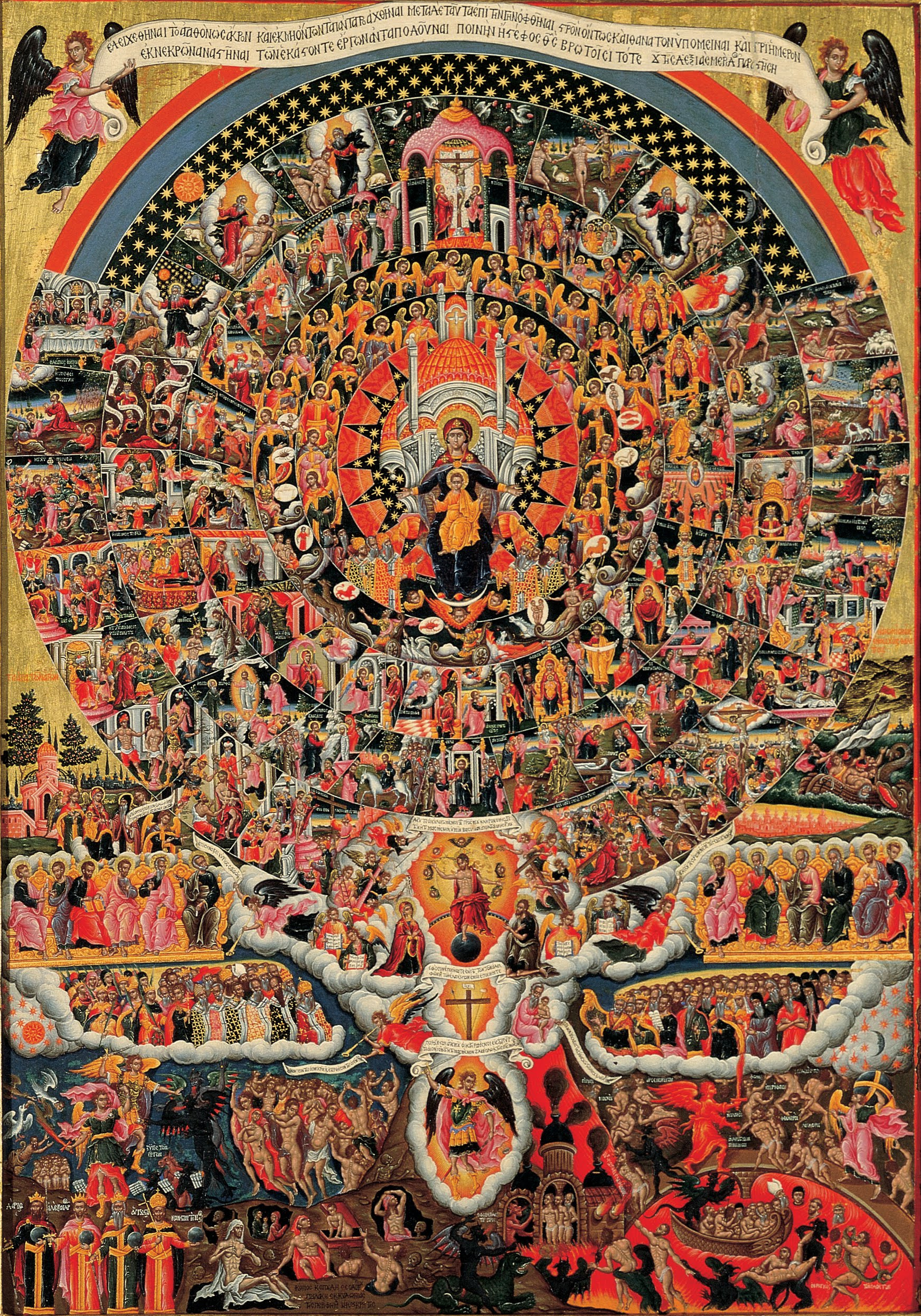
In Thee Rejoiceth (Poulakis)

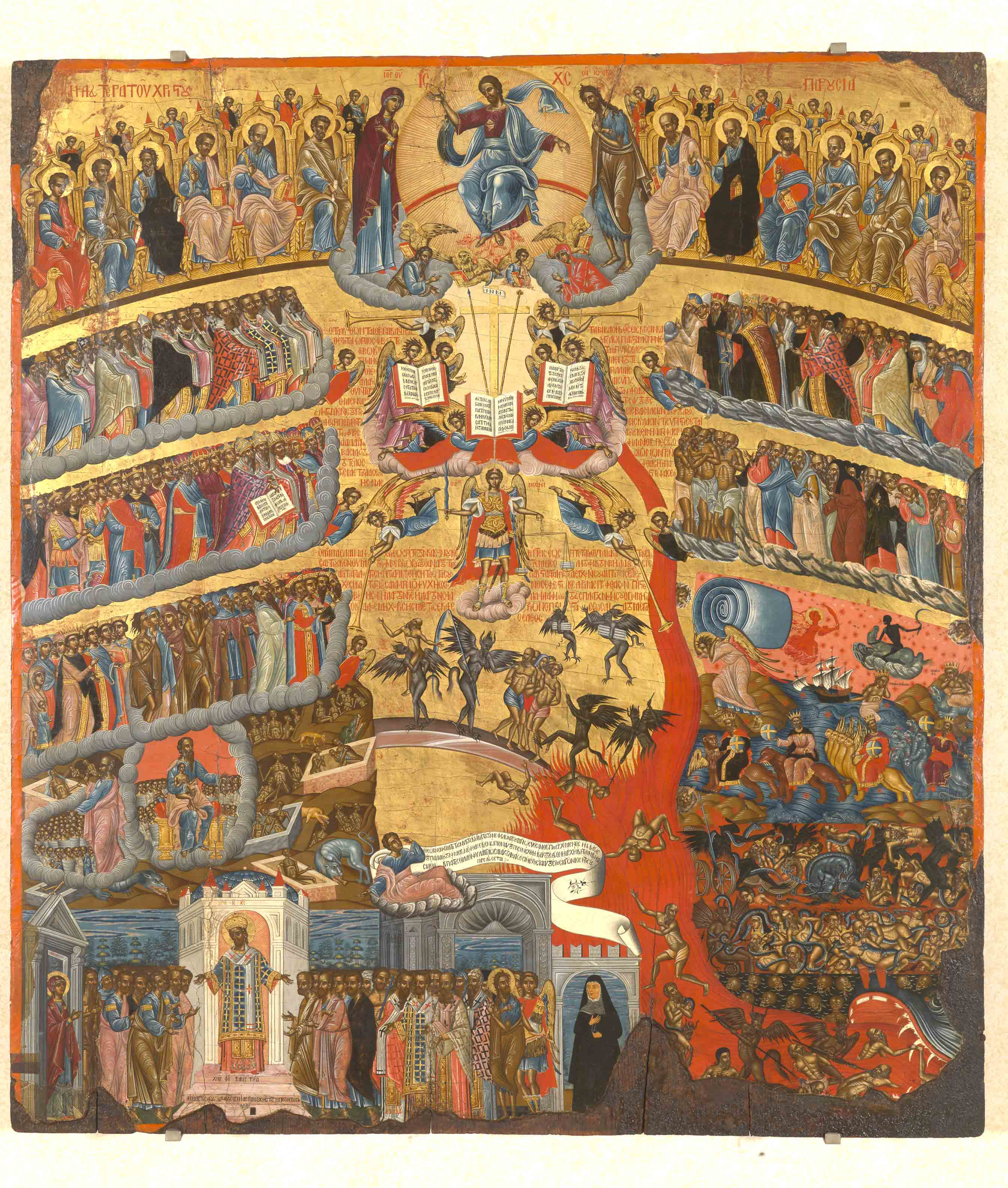
The Last Judgment (Kavertzas)

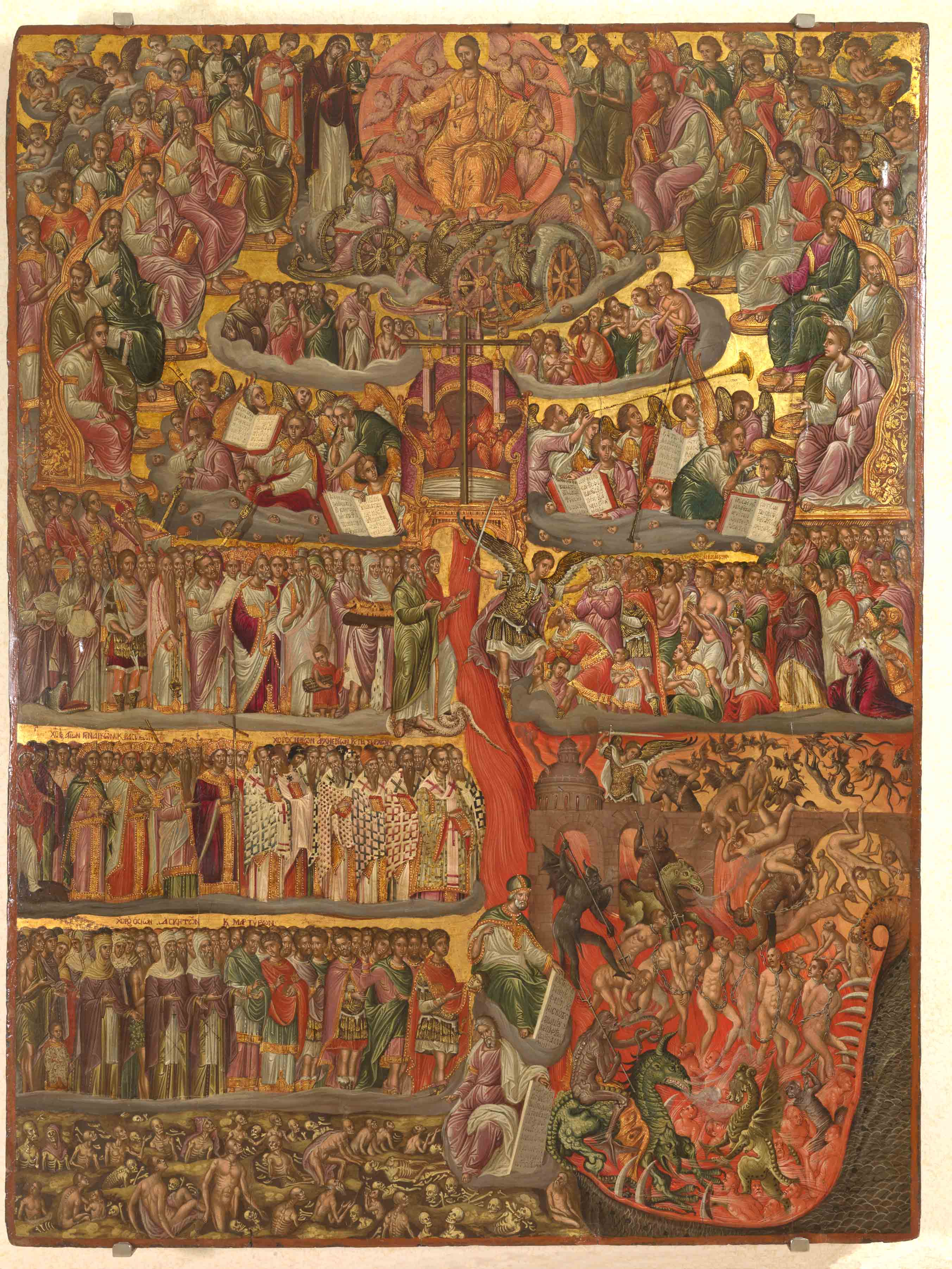
The Last Judgment (Klontzas)

== See also ==
- Hieronymus Bosch

== Bibliography ==
- Hatzidakis, Manolis; Drakopoulou, Evgenia (1997). Έλληνες Ζωγράφοι μετά την Άλωση (1450-1830). Τόμος 2: Καβαλλάρος - Ψαθόπουλος [Greek Painters after the Fall of Constantinople (1450-1830). Volume 2: Kavallaros - Psathopoulos] (in Greek). Athens: Center for Modern Greek Studies, National Research Foundation. hdl:10442/14088. ISBN 960-7916-00-X.
- Siopis, Ioannis (2016). Το θέμα της Δευτέρας Παρουσίας στις Εικόνες [A Detailed History of the Second Coming (Last Judgment) in Greek Paintings] (PDF) (in Greek). Thessaloniki, Greece: Aristotle University of Thessaloniki School of Philosophy Division of Archaeology and History.
- Drandaki, Anastasia (2009). The Origins of El Greco, Icon Painting in Venetian Crete. Athens, Greece: Onassis Foundation. ISBN 9780981966601.
- Speake, Graham (2021). Georgios Klontzas Encyclopedia of Greece and the Hellenic Tradition Maria Constantoudaki. London And New York: Rutledge Taylor & Francis Group. ISBN 9781135942069.
