= Georgios Klontzas =

Greek scholar and hagiographer (1535–1608)

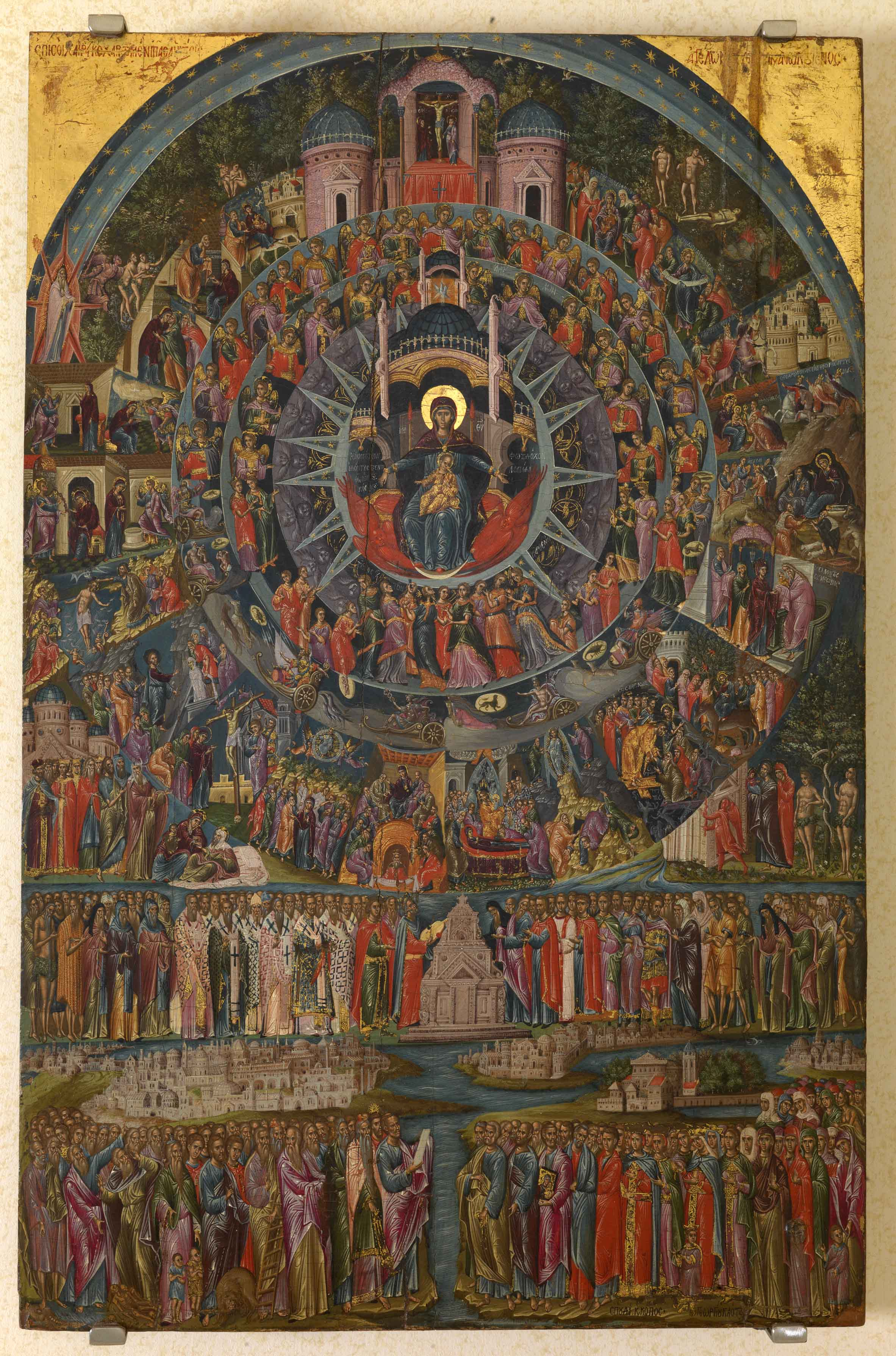
- In Thee Rejoiceth
- Born: 1535; Heraklion, Republic of Venice
- Died: 1608; Heraklion, Republic of Venice
- Known for: Iconography and hagiography
- Notable work: In Thee Rejoiceth; The Last Judgement
- Movement: Cretan school
- Spouse: Erginia Panteleo
- Children: Maneas; Louka; Nikolaos; Marko; Iakovo-Ignatius

Georgios Klontzas (Greek: Γεώργιος Κλώντζας; 1535–1608), also known as George Klontzas or Zorzi Cloza dito Cristianopullo, was a Greek scholar and painter of the Cretan Renaissance. He is one of the most influential artists of the post-Byzantine period, with an artistic output including icons, miniatures, triptychs and illuminated manuscripts, commissioned by both Catholic and Orthodox patrons. Some of Klontzas's icons, including his most popular work, All Creation rejoices in thee, are distinctive, extremely complex compositions populated with countless figures. These were emulated by later painters, including Andreas Pavias in his Crucifixion of Jesus and Theodore Poulakis in his In Thee Rejoiceth, which is extremely similar to Klontzas's work. Klontzas was inspired by Venetian painting- his triptychs strongly resemble the works of Gentile da Fabriano, namely the Intercession Altarpiece- and his Last Judgement bears very close similarities to Michelangelo's work of the same name in the Sistine Chapel. There is no indication that Klontzas saw the Sistine fresco, but it is a possibility. According to the Institute of Neohellenic Research fifty-four items of his art exist today.

== History ==
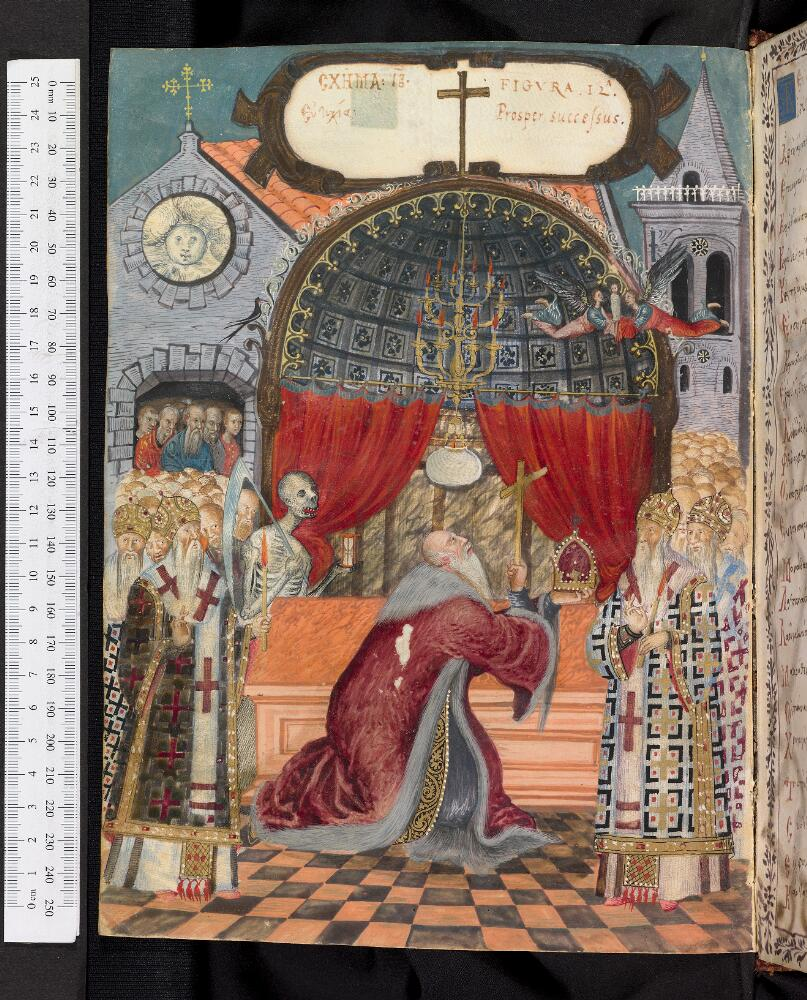
From the Bodleian copy of Klontzas' Oracles

Klontzas was born in Heraklion. His father Andreas Klontzas was associated with the cultured circles of Cretan society. Georgios inherited several houses from his wealthy parents, and was also given the Greek Orthodox church of St Mark in the city of Candia (Herakleion). In 1566, he married Ergina Pantaleos, the daughter of a priest named Emmanuel Pantaleos. Ergina and Georgios had three sons, Loukas, Maneas, and Nicolaus, all of whom were painters. He later remarried to Lia Vitzimanopoula, with whom he had a fourth son.

By 1564, Klontzas was a freelance painter working all over Candia. Two years later, he was hired to assess an icon by Domenikos Theotokopoulos. Records indicated two paintings (now destroyed) were commissioned in 1586. One depicted the healing of the paralyzed individual. The other painting was for the Catholic church of the welfare institution of St Anthony in Candia. By 1587, the painter was commissioned by the Bishop of Karpathos. His name was Ioasaph Avouris. Around that time he purchased his workshop. It was located at the square of Saint Mark in the center of Candia. Klontzas became very popular his patrons included Orthodox and Catholic institutions, Greek bourgeois, and Venetian noblemen.

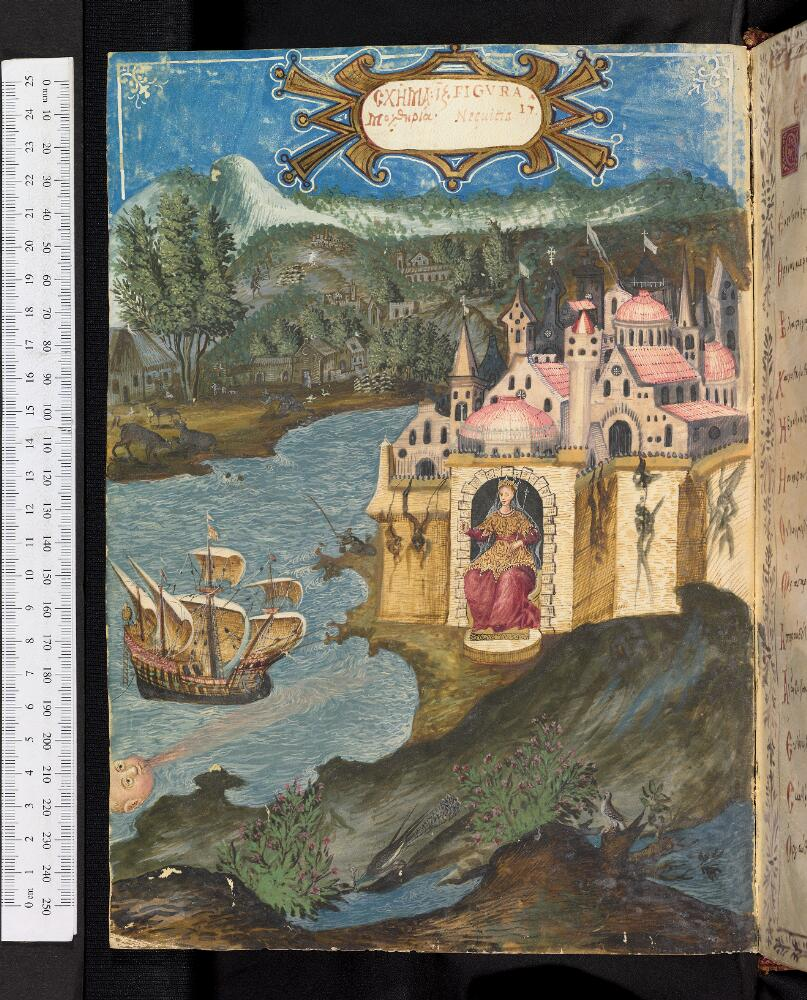
From the Bodleian copy of Klontzas' Oracles

A Venetian nobleman Francesco Barozzi born in Herakleion commissioned Klontzas to create two illuminated manuscripts for Giacomo Foscarini. Foscarini was the administrator and tax collector of Crete. The manuscripts contain the Oracles of Leo the Wise. A third, more complex, leather-bound manuscript was completed during the 1590s. It contains 217 paper folios with over 400 miniature drawings. Klontzas' signature is at the end of the book. The textual frame is proved by the seventh-century Apocalypse of Pseudo-Methodius. It starts with the Expulsion from the Garden of Eden and ends with the Last Judgment. The codex features Biblical and prophetic texts ensconced with Byzantine and Ottoman history. The pictures stylistically resemble Venetian and Flemish icon paintings. Another lesser-known artist from Crete was Markos Bathas. He also completed a manuscript in a similar style.

The painter was probably associated with the poet Antonios Achelis. He was the author of the Siege of Malta (1570) dedicated to Francesco Barozzi. Klontzas's visual motifs and Achelis's writings share a connection. Klontzas created a book of prophecies which he gave to his son Loukas in 1597. Klontzes died in 1608.

== All Creation Rejoices In Thee ==
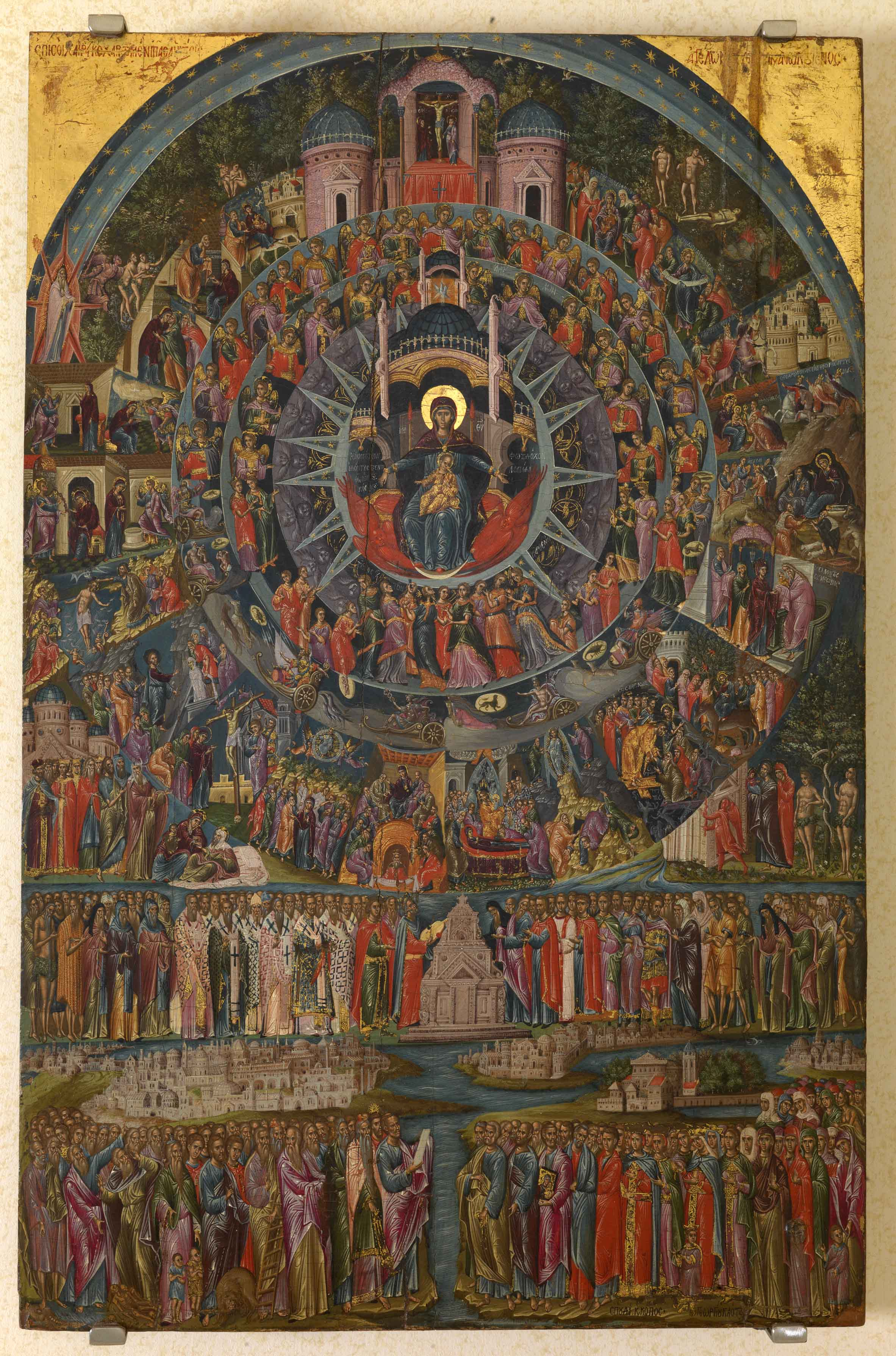
All Creation rejoices in thee, Georgios Klontzas

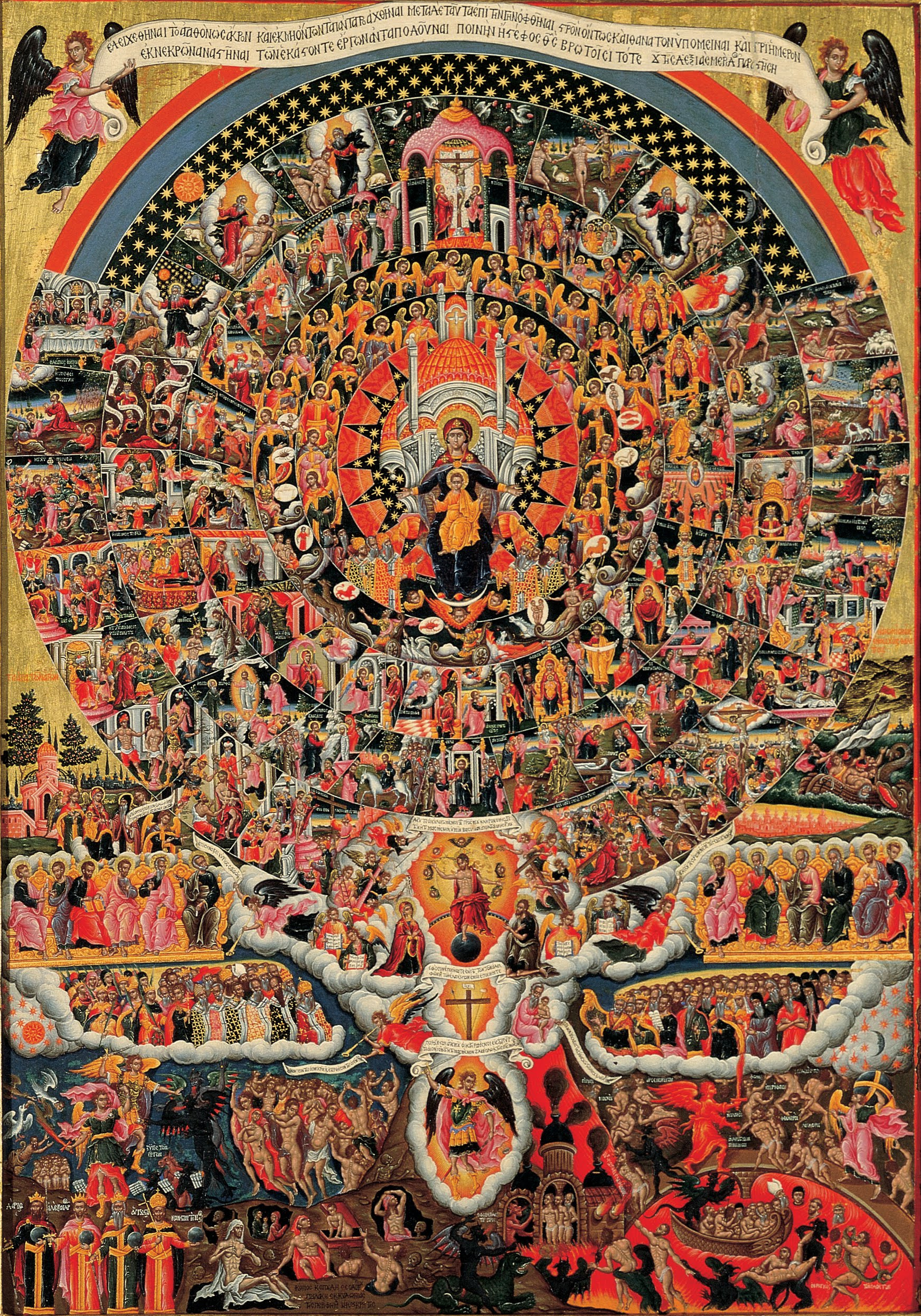
The Hymn to the Virgin, "Eπί Σοί Xαίρει In Thee Rejoiceth Theodore Poulakis (1622–1692)

Klontzas's icon All Creation rejoices in Thee was inspired by a hymn composed by the Syrian monk John of Damascus. It was used in the Divine Liturgy of Saint Basil the Great during the Liturgy of the Faithful. The hymn is as follows:

All of Creation rejoices in thee, O full of grace
the angels in heaven and the race of men,
O sanctified temple and spiritual paradise,
the glory of virgins, of whom God was incarnate
and became a child, our God before the ages.
He made thy body into a throne,
and thy womb more spacious than the heavens.
All of creation rejoices in thee, O full of grace

Glory be to thee.

The Virgin, enthroned and holding the infant Christ, is the central figure in the icon. She is surrounded by hierarchal concentric circles. Seraphim occupy the circle closest to the Virgin, with Cherubs and other angels in the succeeding layers. Even further from the center are New and Old Testament narratives. At the bottom is a huge group of saints in Jerusalem. The entire universe praises Mary for her role in Jesus's work.

Klontzas's painting style evolved into the complex use of figures which put the artist in a league of his own. The maniera greca was common in Crete but Klontzas's paintings become saturated with figures. He developed his own style. Andreas Pavias Crucifixion of Jesus exhibits a similar technique. There is a huge audience at the Crucifixion which is traditionally uncommon. Theodoros Poulakis painting In Thee Rejoiceth, is so close to Klontzas's work that it can be mistaken for a Klontzas.

Klontzas's work The Last Judgement see below exhibits a huge assortment of figures. Similar to In Thee Rejoiceth. Theodoros Poulakis in his second In Thee Rejoiceth does not cluster the figures as much as Klontzas and it may have preceded the similar work. Klontzas's demon wolf-like figures depicted in The Last Judgement inspired many of Theodoros Poulakis dark creatures. This is illustrated in the Archangel Michael and the Death of Moses.

== Legacy ==
It is difficult to trace his work based on specific time frames. Several icons bear his forged signature. Remnants of his work can be found all over the world some in the Bodleian Library, Oxford, Moscow, State Historical Museum, and Vatican Library. His portable icons, triptychs, and illuminated manuscripts are common and popular. His most popular works include: In Thee Rejoiceth, The Last Judgement, Seventh Ecumenical Council, Christ Enthroned and Scenes from the Dodekaorton (Twelve Great Feasts), Sermon in a Church, and Battle of Lepanto. A detailed manuscript map of the city of Candia with his son Maneas's signature also survives.

== Gallery ==
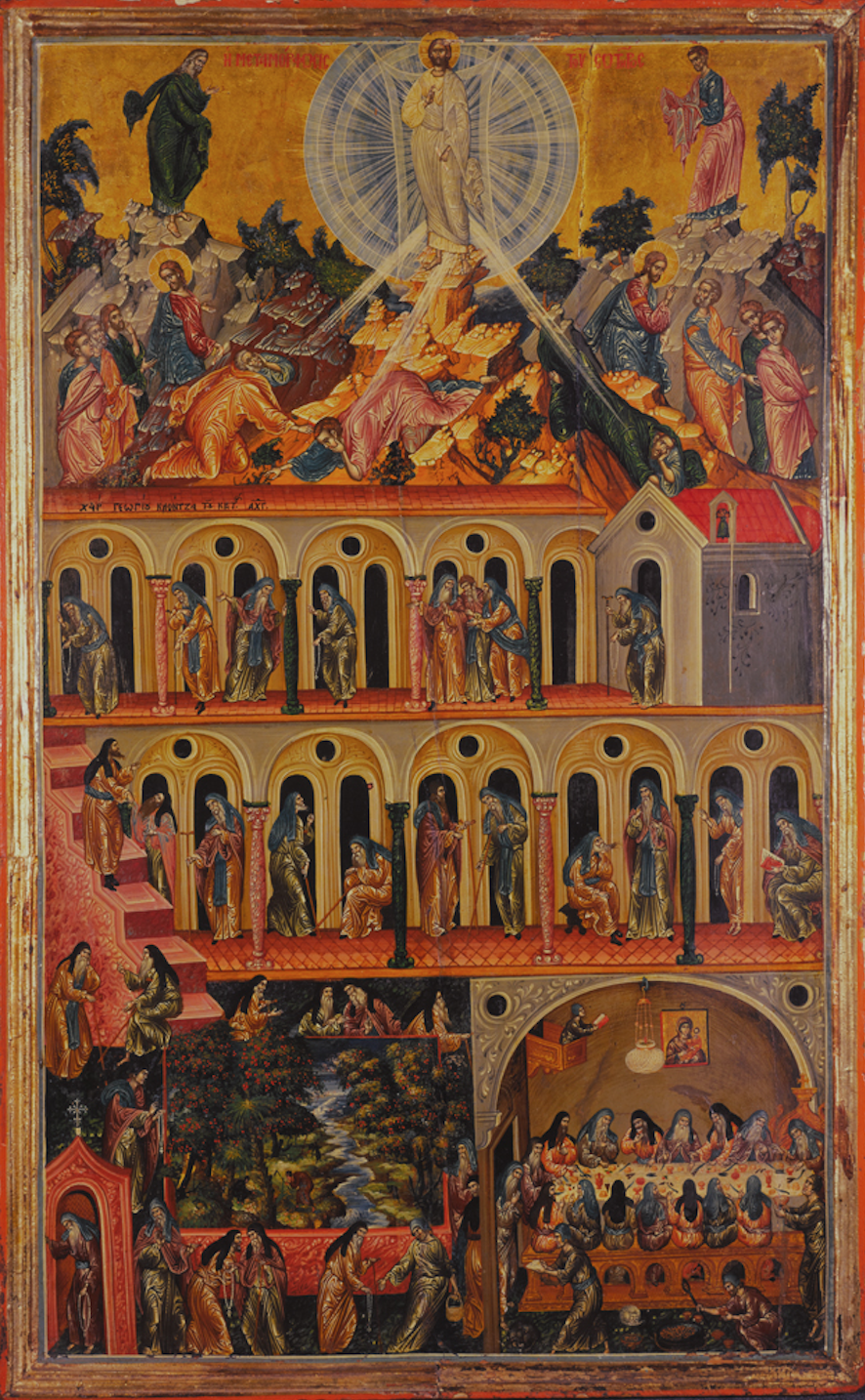
Transfiguration and Monastic Scenes 1603

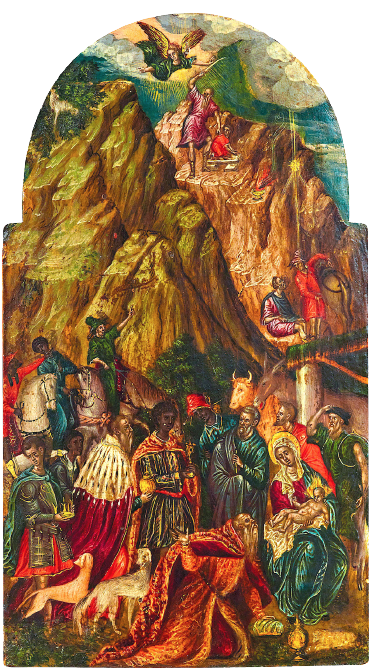
The Sacrifice of Abraham and the Adoration of the Magi

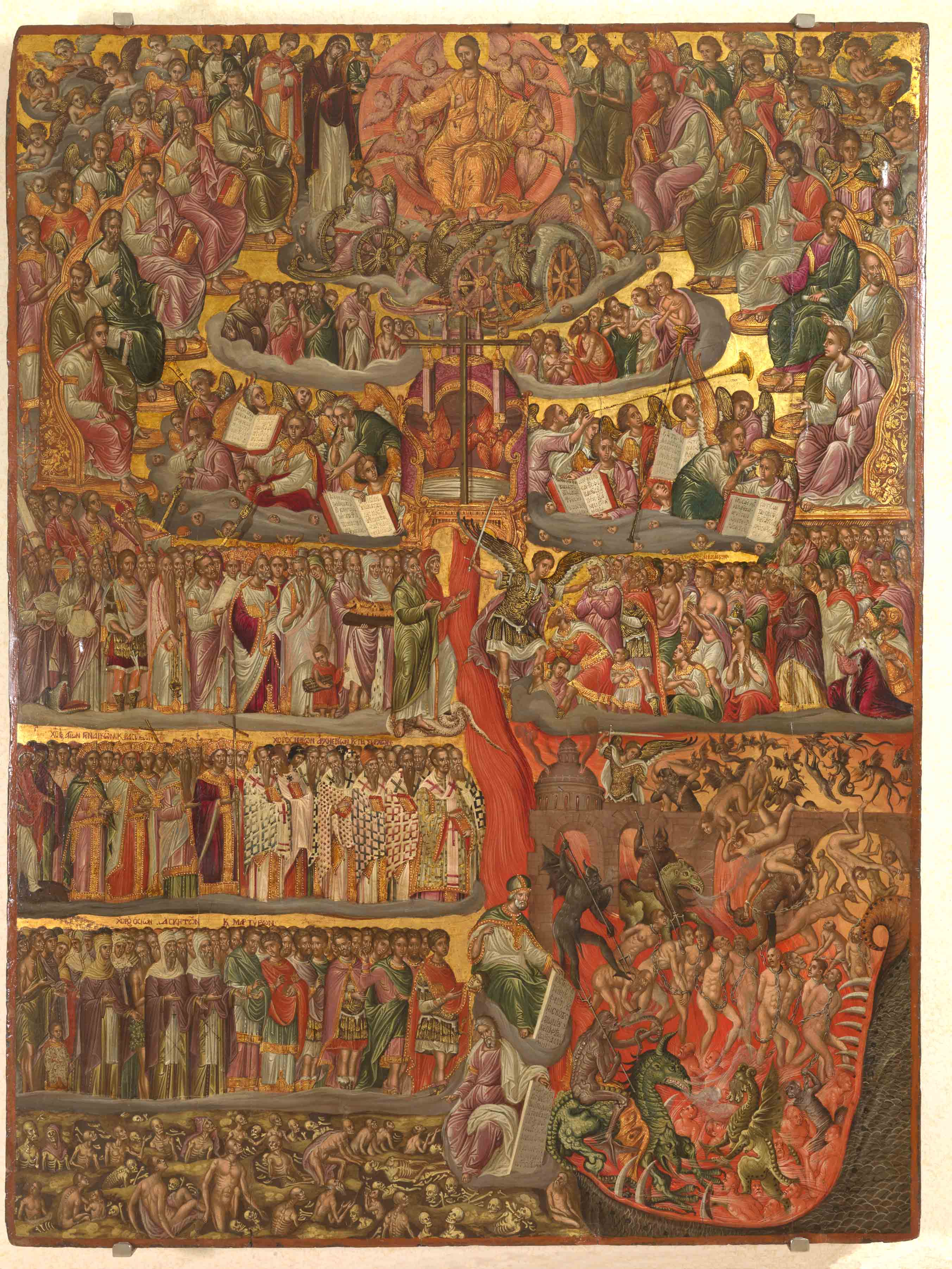
The Last Judgement

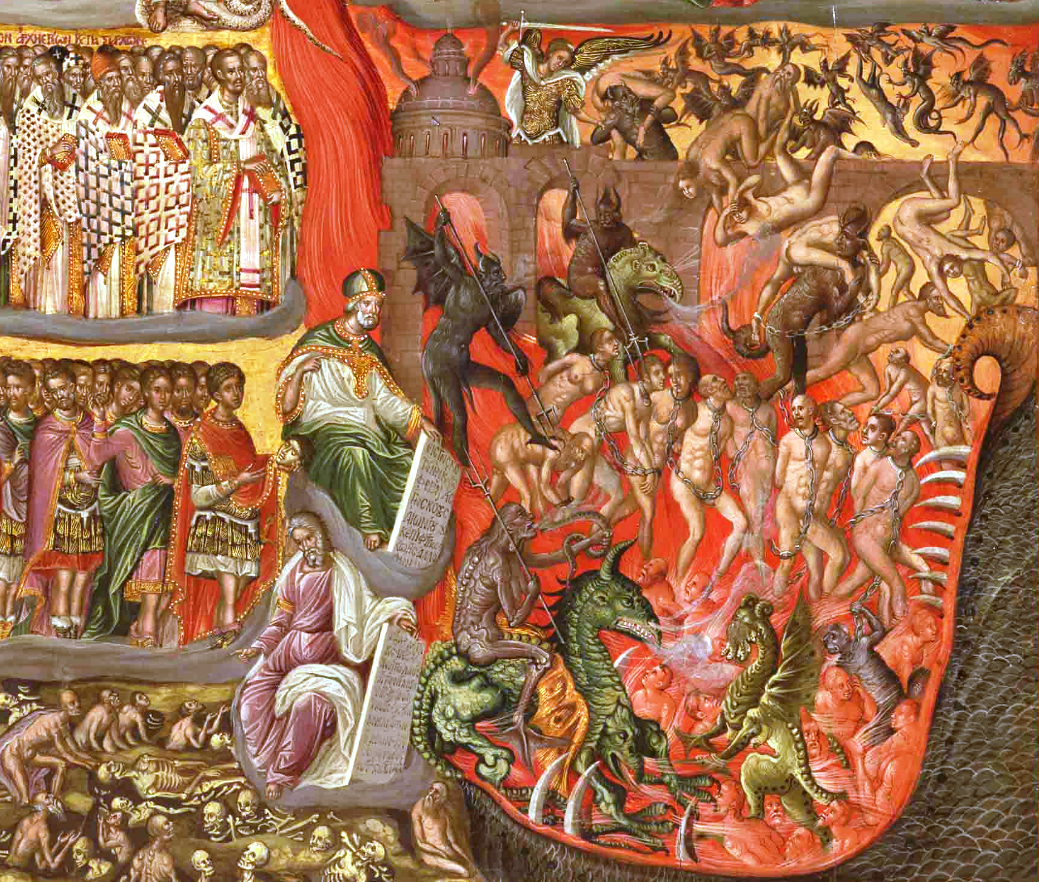
The Last Judgement detail

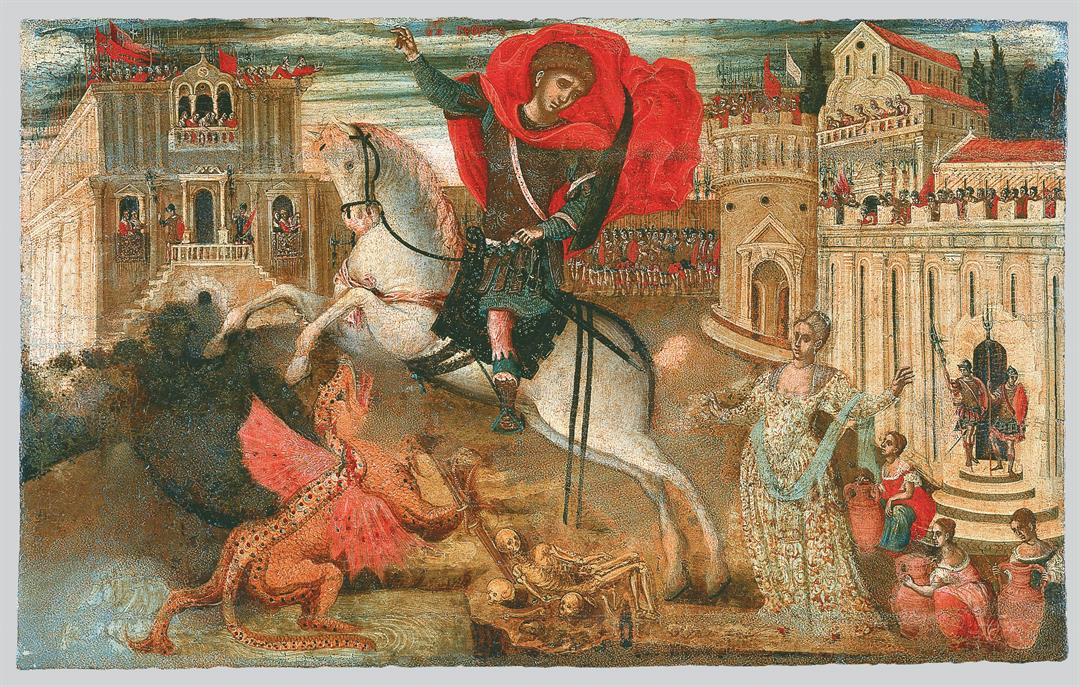
Saint George the Dragon-Slayer

=== Triptychs ===
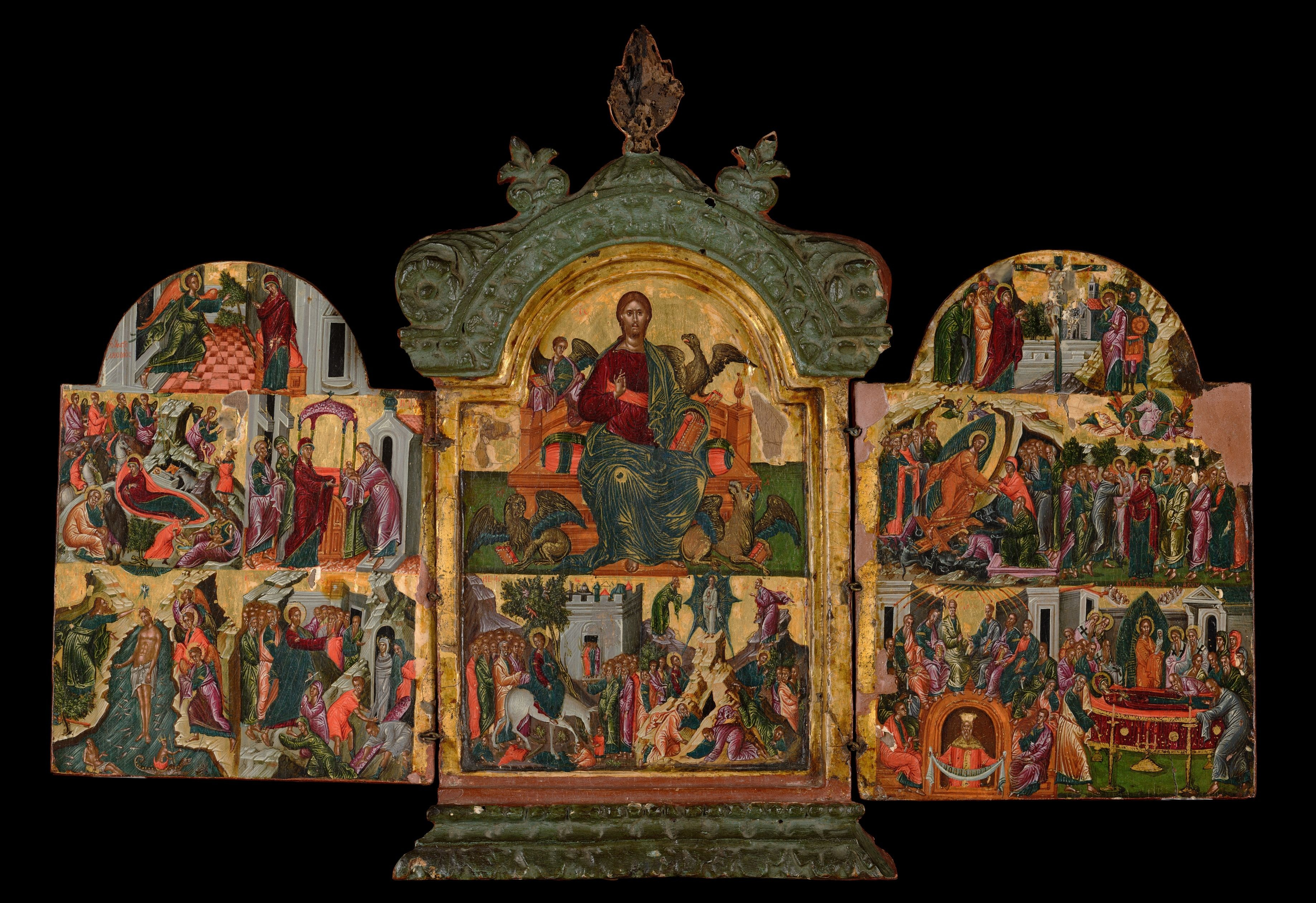
Monastero di San Giovanni

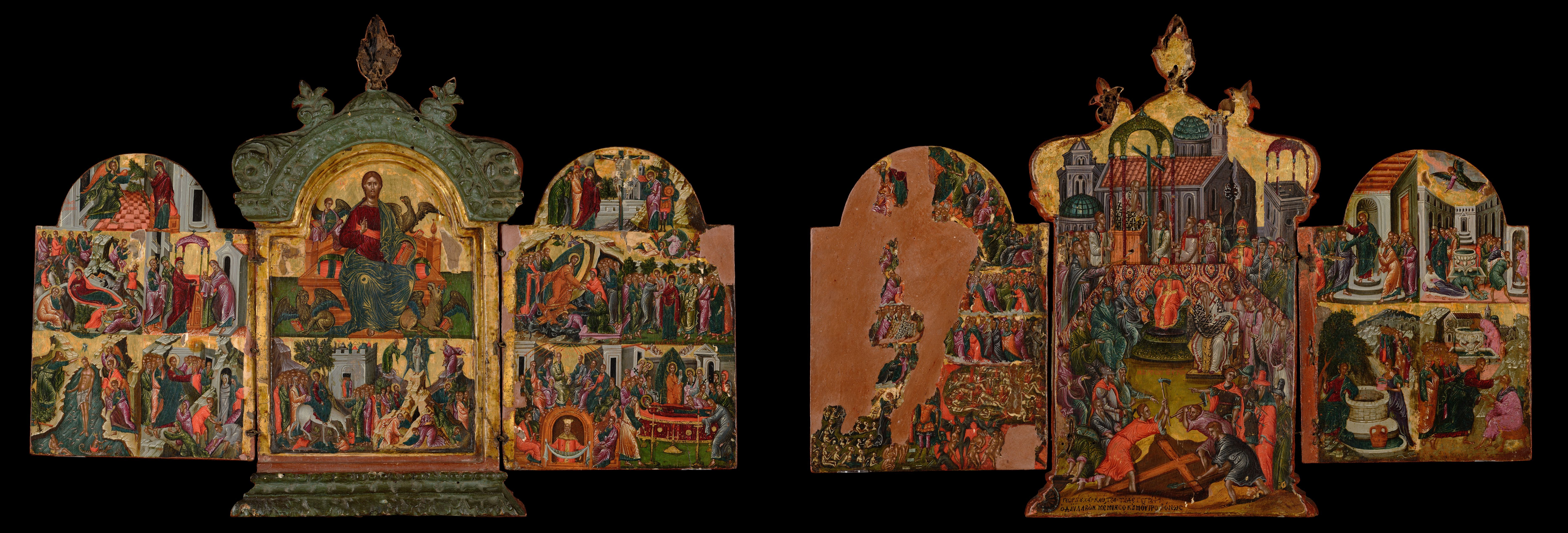
Two Triptychs between 1580 and 1600

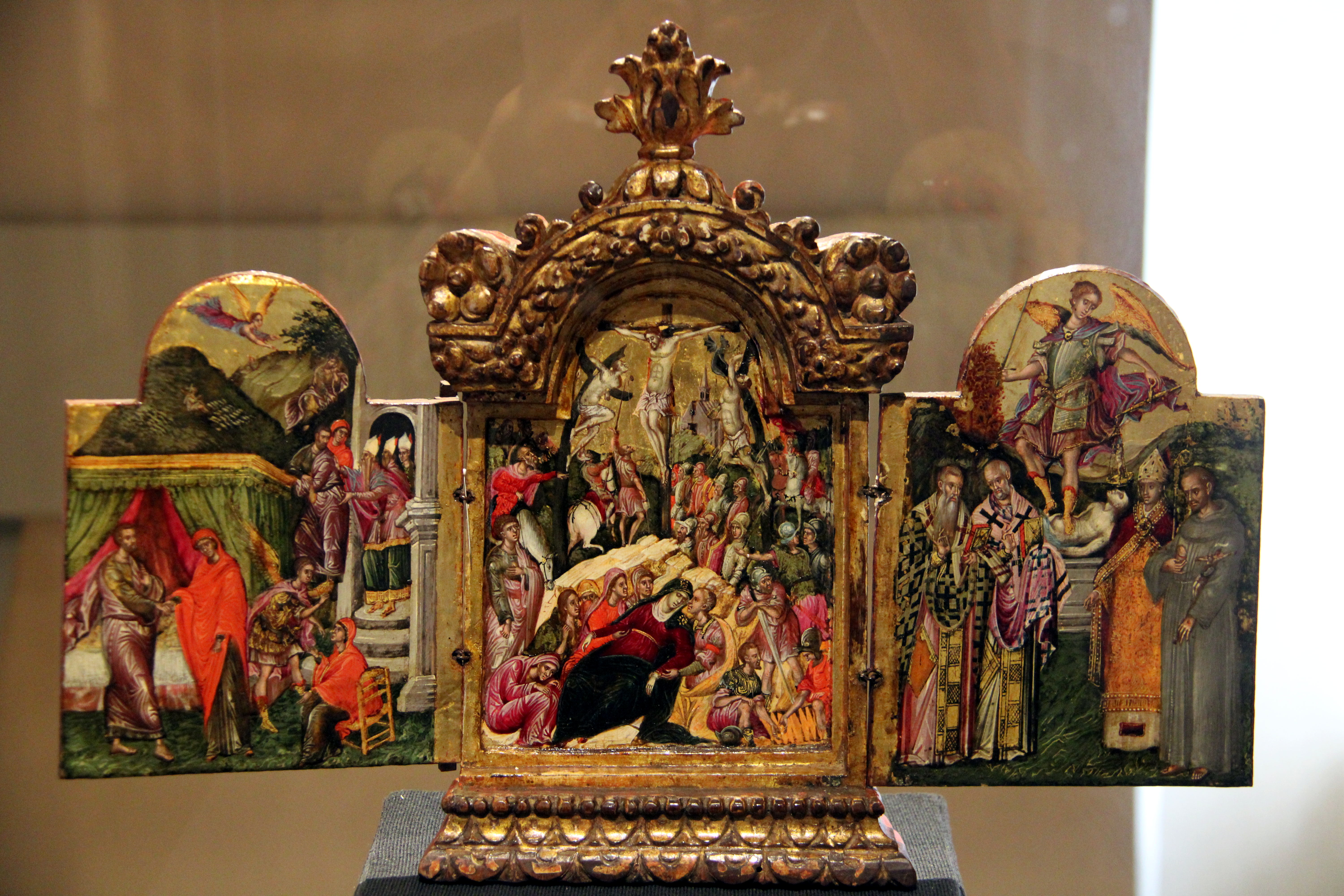
Triptych

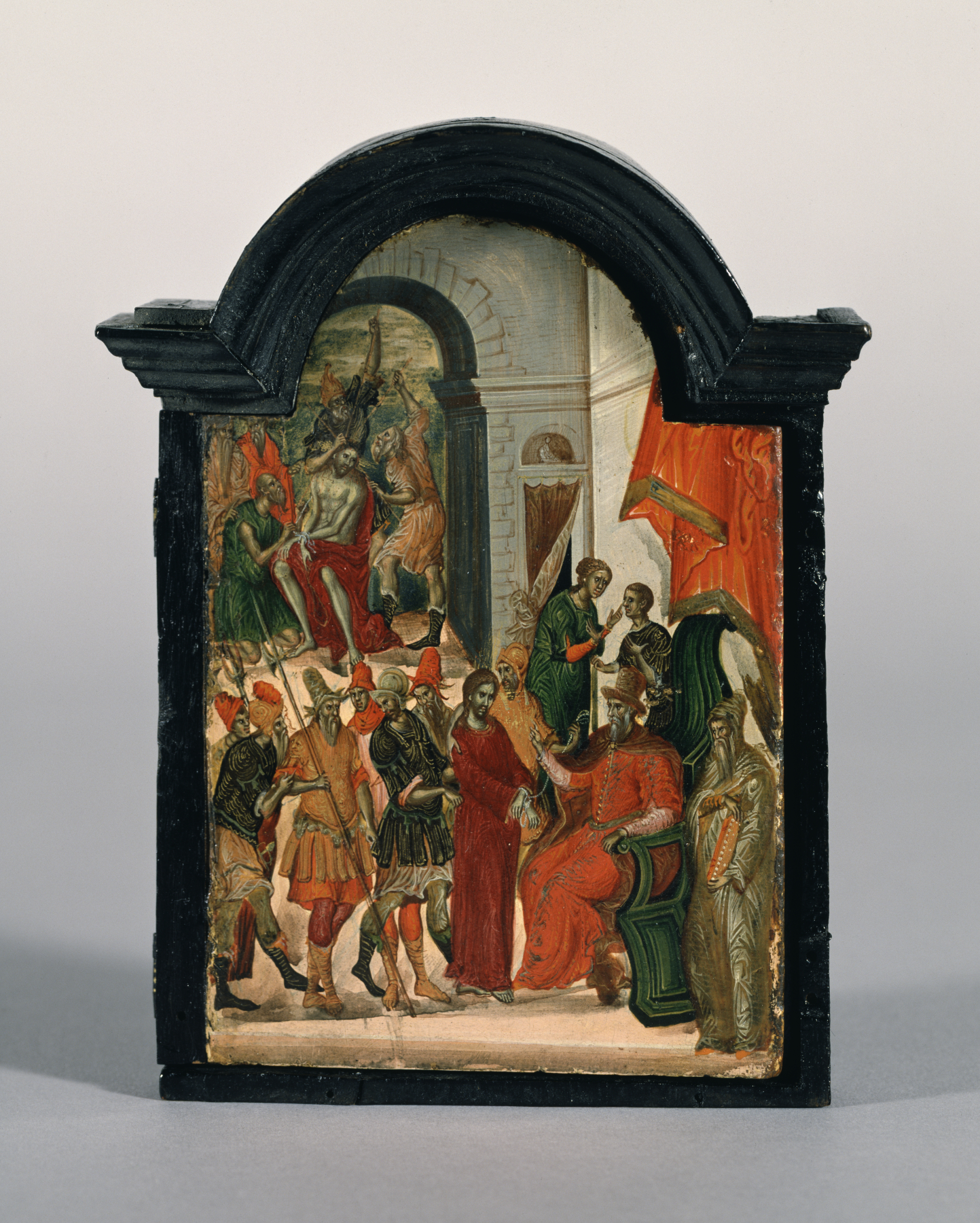
Triptych Scenes of Christ's Passion

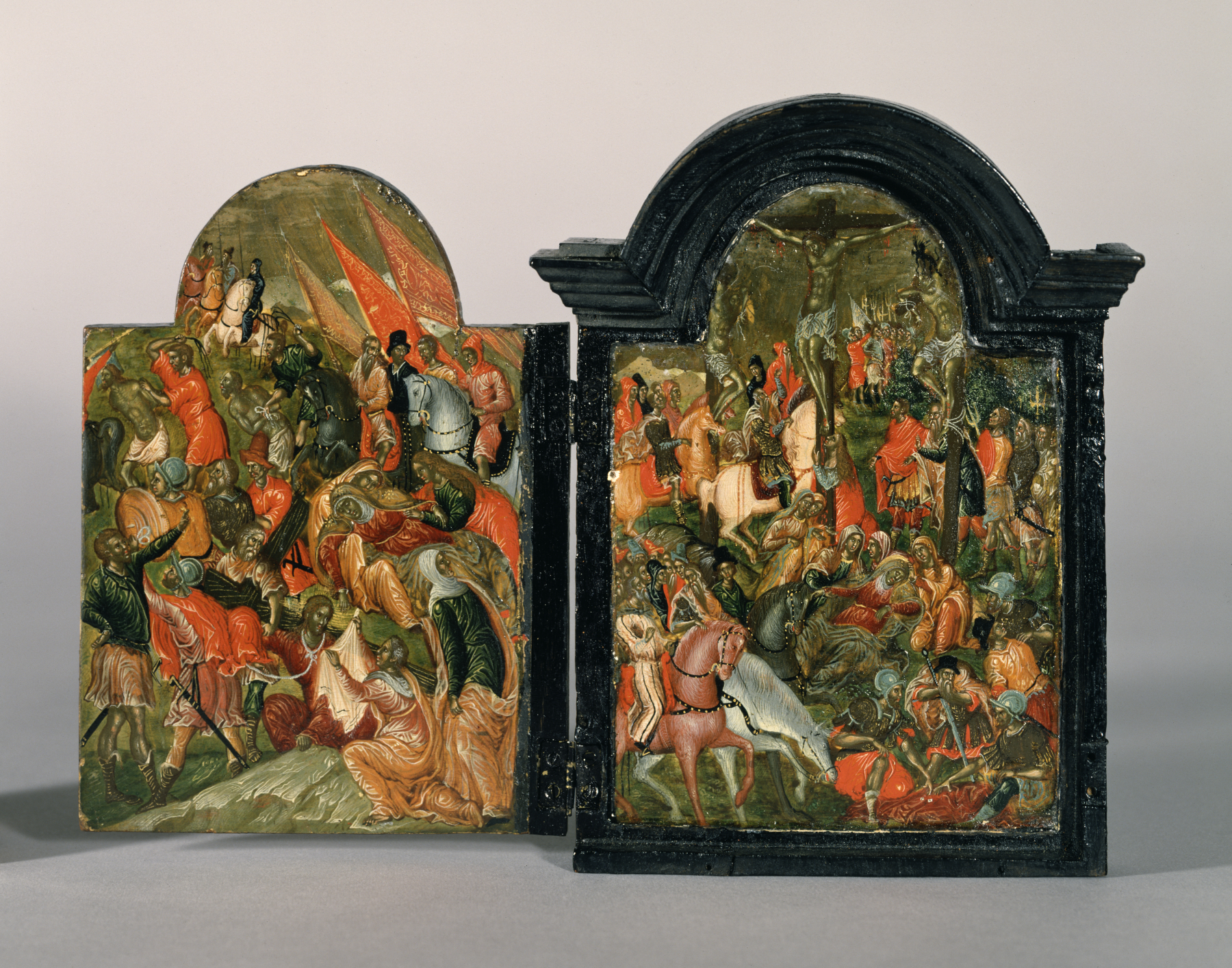
Triptych Scenes of Christ's Passion

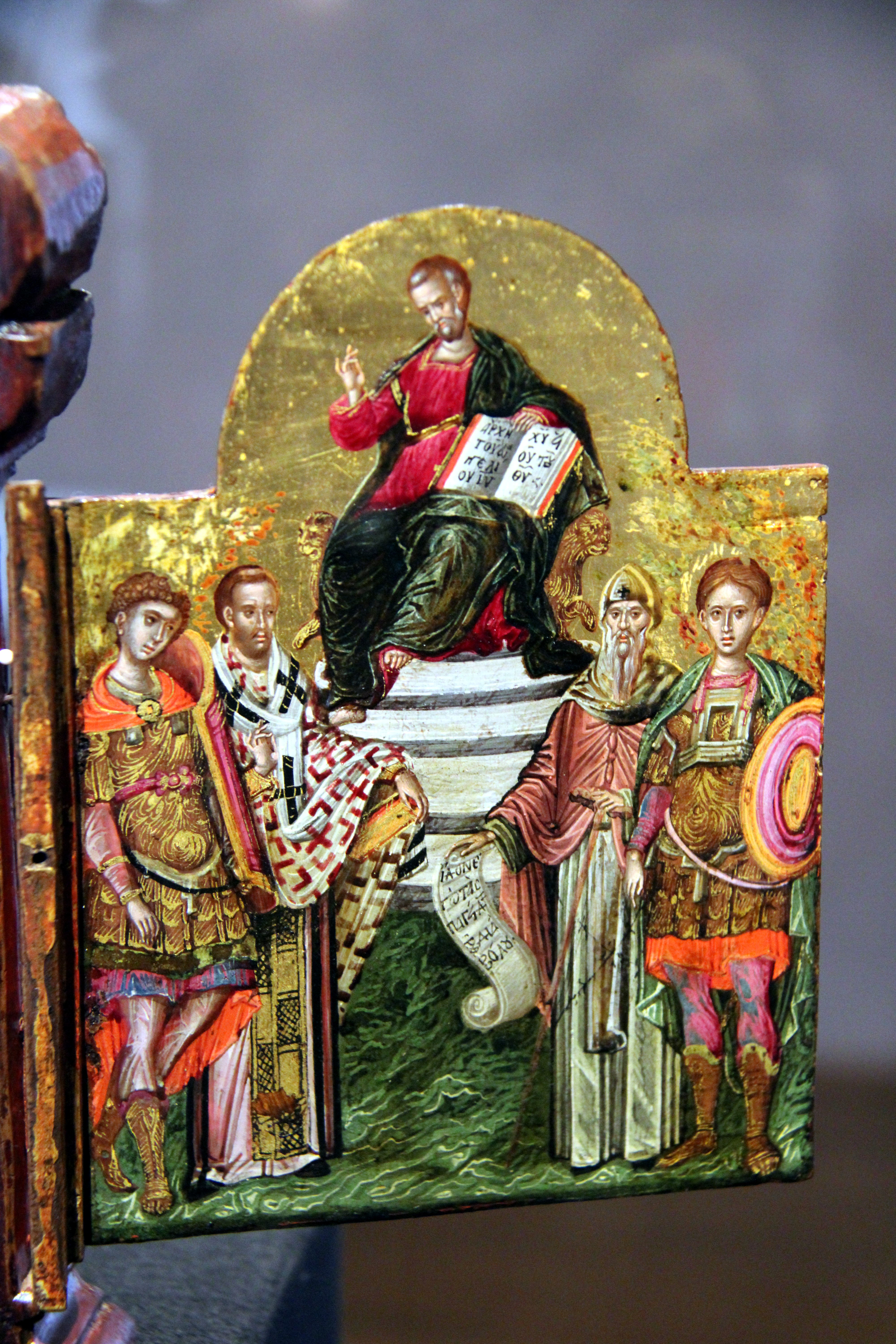
Miniature Triptych

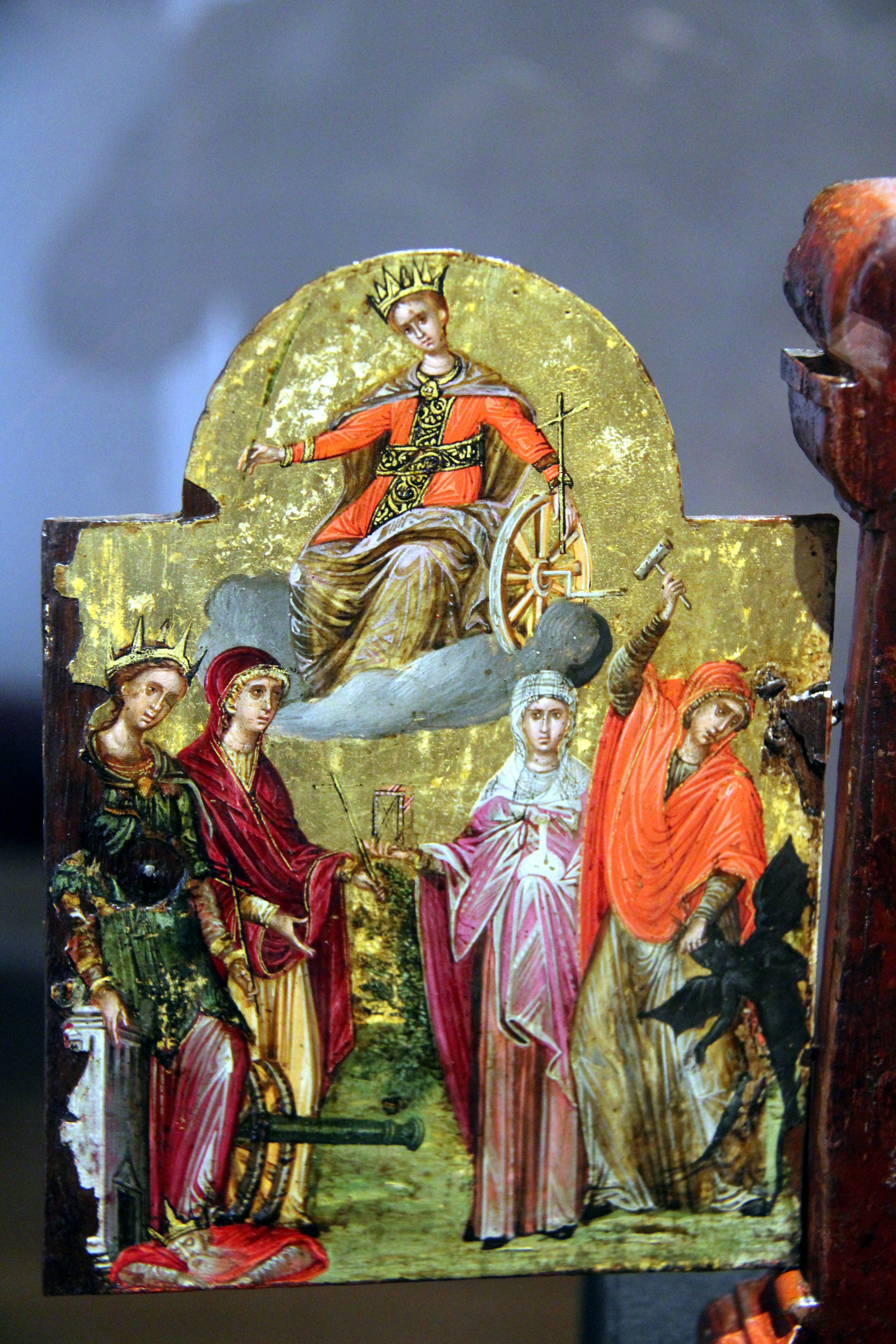
Miniature Triptych

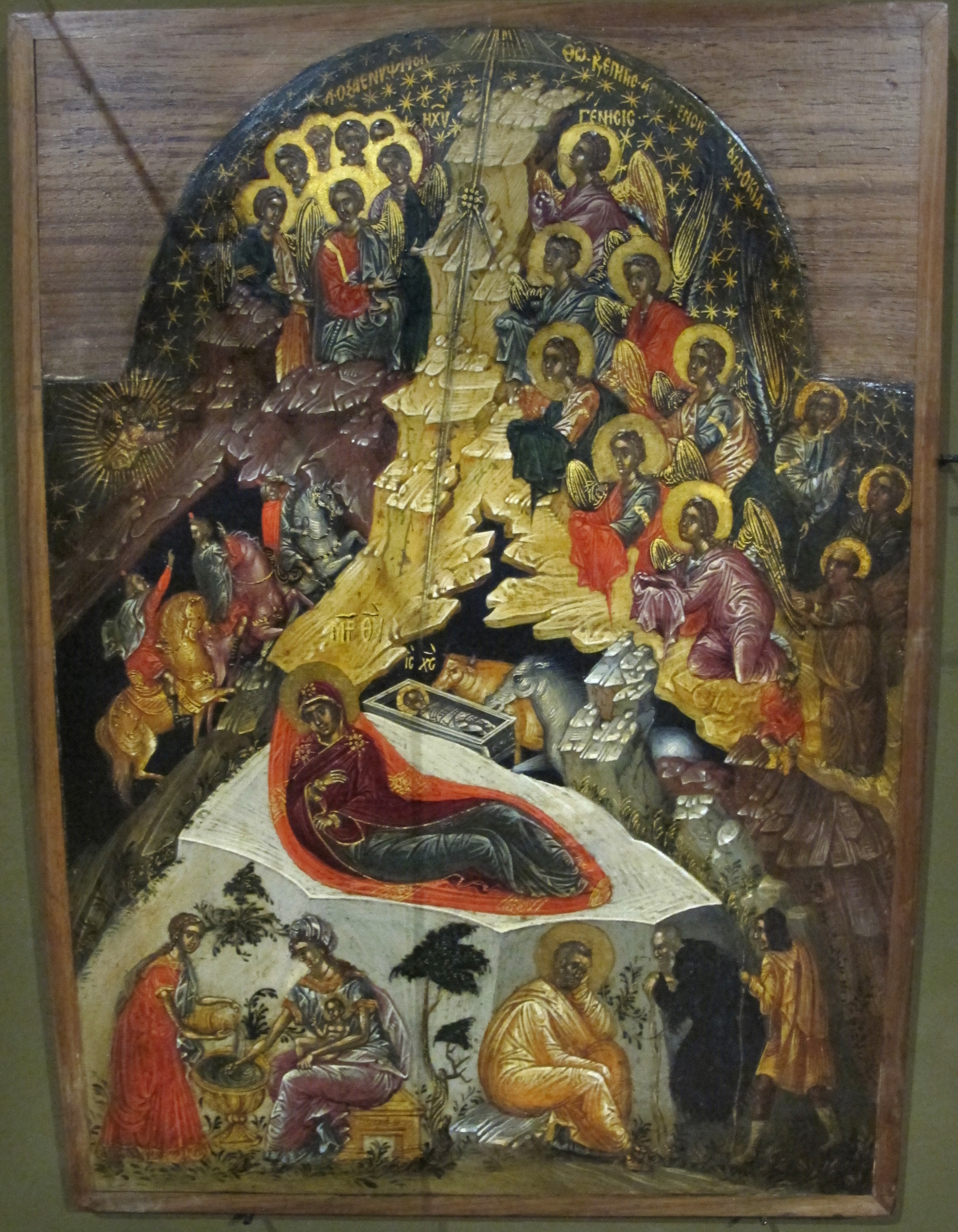
Miniature Triptych

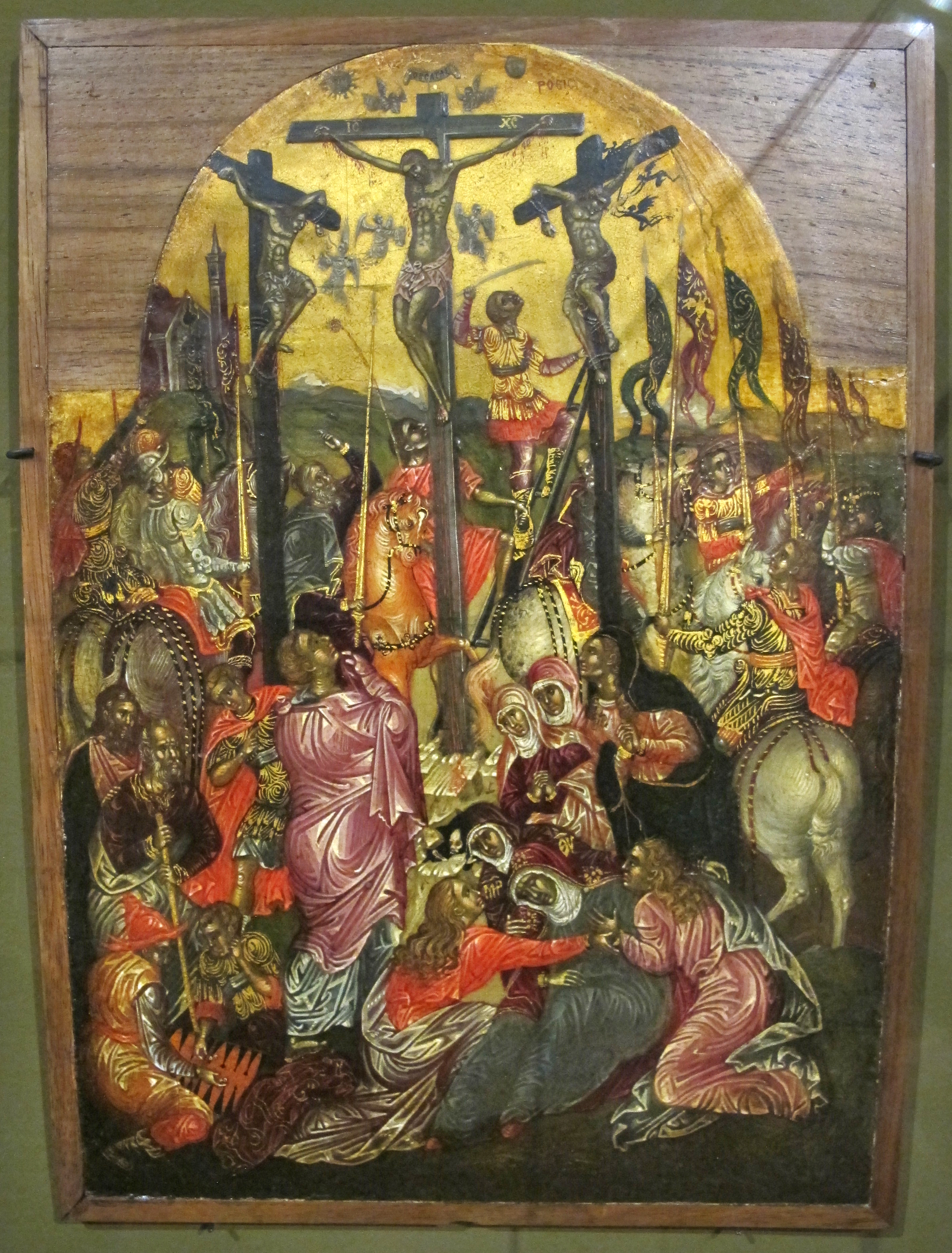
Miniature Triptych

== Manuscripts ==
- Codex of Georgios Klontzas at the Biblioteca Nazionale Marciana, Gr. VII 22 (=1466), Venice, Italy
- Codex of Georgios Klontzas (Oracula) at Bodleian Library MS. Barocci 170, Oxford, United Kingdom

== Notable works ==
- In Thee Rejoiceth (Klontzas)
- The Last Judgement (Klontzas)
- Transfiguration and Monastic Scenes (Klontzas)
- Triptych of the Last Judgement (Klontzas)
- The Last Judgement Triptych (Klontzas)
- Saint Catherine's Engagement (Klontzas)

== See also ==
- Greek scholars in the Renaissance
- Gentile da Fabriano
- Franghias Kavertzas

== Bibliography ==
- Speake, Graham (2021). Georgios Klontzas Encyclopedia of Greece and the Hellenic Tradition Maria Constantoudaki. London And New York: Rutledge Taylor & Francis Group. p. 893. ISBN 9781135942069.
- Hatzidakis, Manolis (1987). Έλληνες Ζωγράφοι μετά την Άλωση (1450-1830). Τόμος 1: Αβέρκιος - Ιωσήφ [Greek Painters after the Fall of Constantinople (1450-1830). Volume 1: Averkios - Iosif]. Athens: Center for Modern Greek Studies, National Research Foundation. hdl:10442/14844. ISBN 960-7916-01-8.
- Hatzidakis, Manolis; Drakopoulou, Evgenia (1997). Έλληνες Ζωγράφοι μετά την Άλωση (1450-1830). Τόμος 2: Καβαλλάρος - Ψαθόπουλος [Greek Painters after the Fall of Constantinople (1450-1830). Volume 2: Kavallaros - Psathopoulos]. Athens: Center for Modern Greek Studies, National Research Foundation. hdl:10442/14088. ISBN 960-7916-00-X.
- Drakopoulou, Evgenia (2010). Έλληνες Ζωγράφοι μετά την Άλωση (1450–1830). Τόμος 3: Αβέρκιος - Ιωσήφ [Greek Painters after the Fall of Constantinople (1450–1830). Volume 3: Averkios - Joseph]. Athens, Greece: Center for Modern Greek Studies, National Research Foundation. ISBN 978-960-7916-94-5.
