= Saint Catherine's Engagement (Klontzas) =

Painting by Georgios Klontzas

- Μνηστεία Αγίας Αικατερίνης (Greek), Matrimonio Mistico di Santa Caterina (Italian)
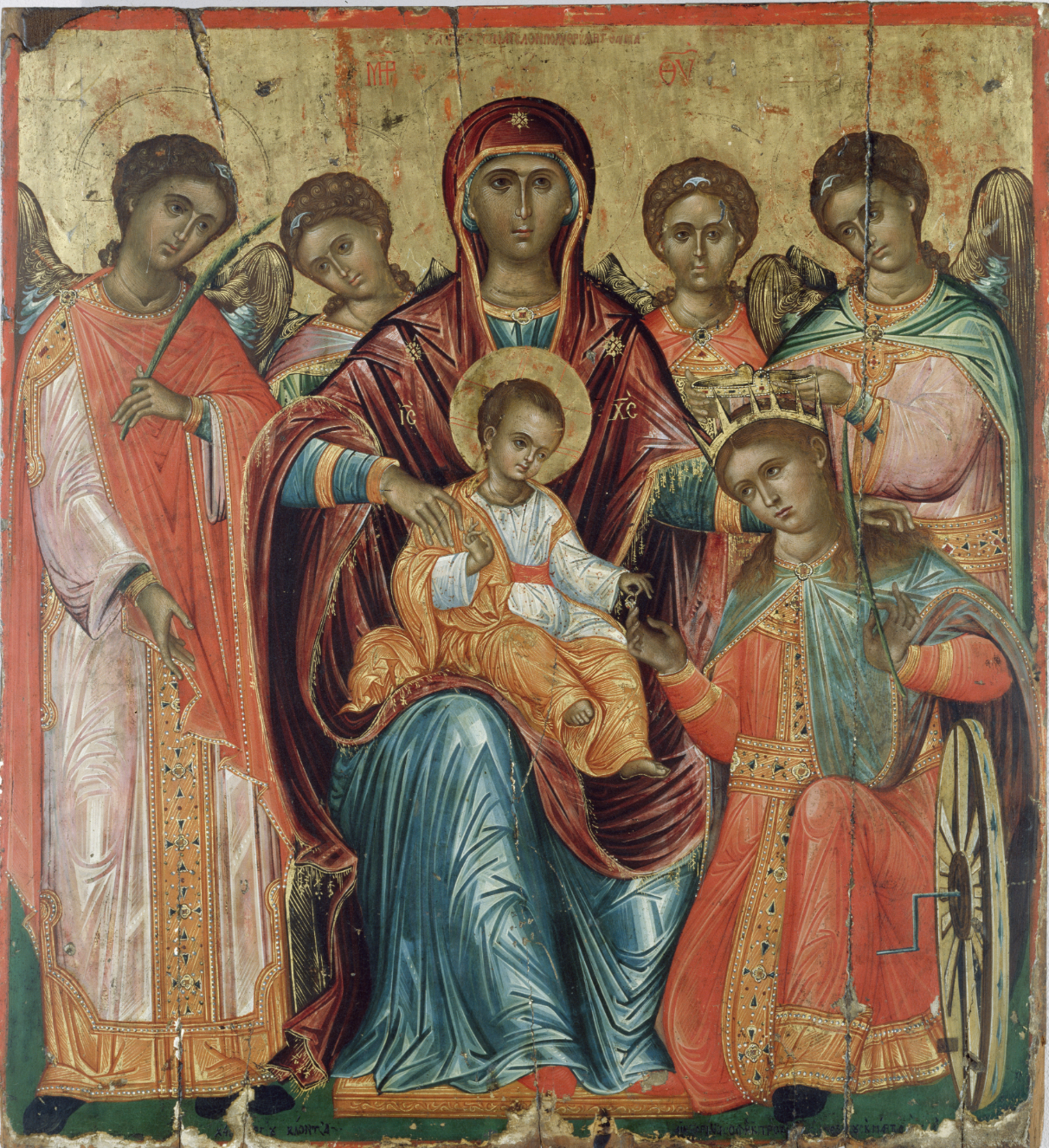
- Artist: Georgios Klontzas
- Year: 1550-1608
- Medium: tempera on wood
- Movement: Cretan School
- Subject: Mystical Marriage of Saint Catherine with Infant Jesus and Virgin Mary
- Dimensions: 86 cm × 78 cm (33.8 in × 30.7 in)
- Location: Saint Demetrios Metropolitan Church of Arta, Arta, Greece
- Owner: Saint Demetrios Metropolitan Church of Arta

Saint Catherine's Engagement Saint Catherine's Engagement is a tempera painting created by Greek painter Georgios Klontzas. Typically, paintings featuring the theme are commonly referred to as the Mystical marriage of Saint Catherine. Klontzas was born in Heraklion, Crete, and was a member of the Cretan School active from 1550-1608 during the middle period of the Cretan Renaissance. Klontzas was familiar with the works of El Greco because he was hired to assess his art. Klontzas created portable icons, triptychs, and illuminated manuscripts. He is notable for his Last Judgment themes. His existing catalog consists of Fifty-four works. Klontzas also painted the Transfiguration and Monastic Scenes to honor Saint Catherine's Monastery in Egypt.

A princess who lived in Alexandria, Egypt, named Catherine, converted to the new Christian faith from 287 to 305 AD. Emperor Maxentius put her to torture because she converted hundreds to the new Christian faith. A spiked wheel was used in an attempt to put her to death, but it shattered upon her touch. Eventually, she was beheaded. Since her canonization around the 4th century, the martyr has been featured in art. A movement began during the Middle Ages depicting her as the bride of Christ. One of the earliest known depictions of the mystical marriage of Catherine to Jesus dates back to the 12th century and gained popularity during the proto-Renaissance, continuing into the Renaissance period.

The Master of the Redeemer completed a notable work entitled Polyptych of the Seven Saints, with the Marriage of St. Catherine of Alexandria between 1310-50. In the 1420s, Michelino da Besozzo completed his version titled Mystical Marriage of Saint Catherine. Klontzas completed his work sometime during the latter part of the 1500s. All three paintings feature Christ offering Catherine an engagement ring. Klontzas' work of art is currently at Saint Demetrios Metropolitan Cathedral in Arta, Greece. The work of art was moved from a neighboring church called Agia Sophia of Arta.

== Description ==
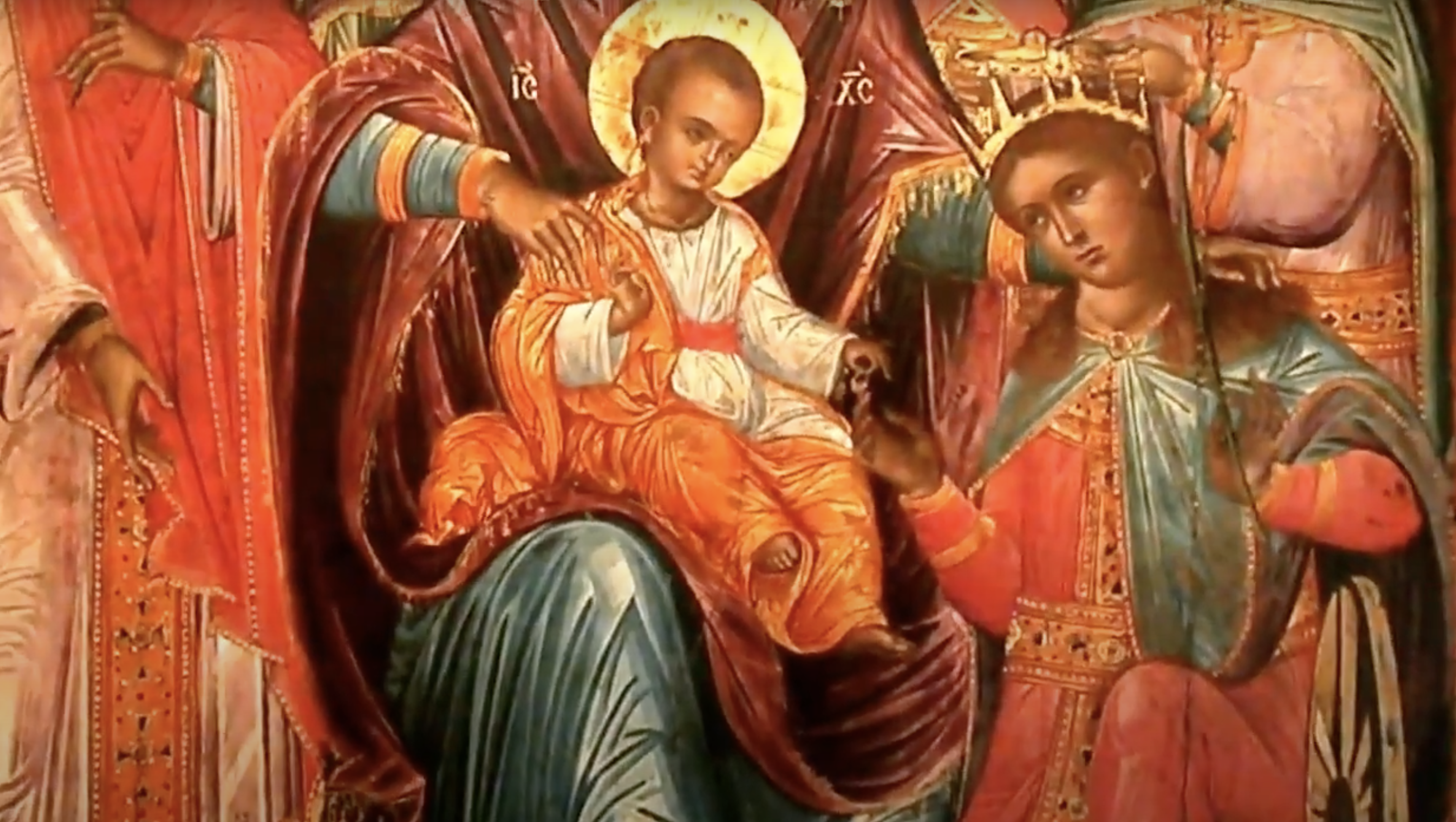
Close Up of Catherine

The materials used were egg tempera paint on gold leaf and wood panel. The height is 86 cm (33.8 in), and the width: 78 cm (30.7 in). The work of art was completed sometime between 1550-1608. The work features three main celestial ecclesiastical figures: the Virgin Mary, the Infant Jesus, and a youthful Catherine of Alexandria, surrounded by four angels. Catherine is wearing a princess's crown while she is genuflecting to the infant Christ, accepting her engagement ring. She is also holding a martyr's palm while she is next to a spiked wheel, the symbol of her martyrdom. Two angels hold symbols representing Catherine. One angel holds a martyr's palm, while another crowns her as Jesus' queen, symbolizing her mystical and spiritual union with Jesus Christ. The Virgin Mary is featured in her traditional red frock with the symbols ΙC ΧC Ίσως Χριστός (Jesus Christ ) on her garment, while above her head, the symbols ΜΡ ΘΥ Μήτερ θεού (Mother of God) appear. The position of the Madonna and Child is the traditional Our Lady of the Sign or Nikopoios, but the infant Jesus is facing Catherine instead of the viewers. The icon follows the traditional maniera greca and is clearly characterized by a gilded background, flattened space, and striations to suggest folds of fabric. The drapery folds and the position of the figures create a three-dimensional space. Catherine is wearing a cape-like Pellegrina which is draped over her dress, her stole is draped over the vestment. The work features the painter's signature at the bottom.

== Gallery ==
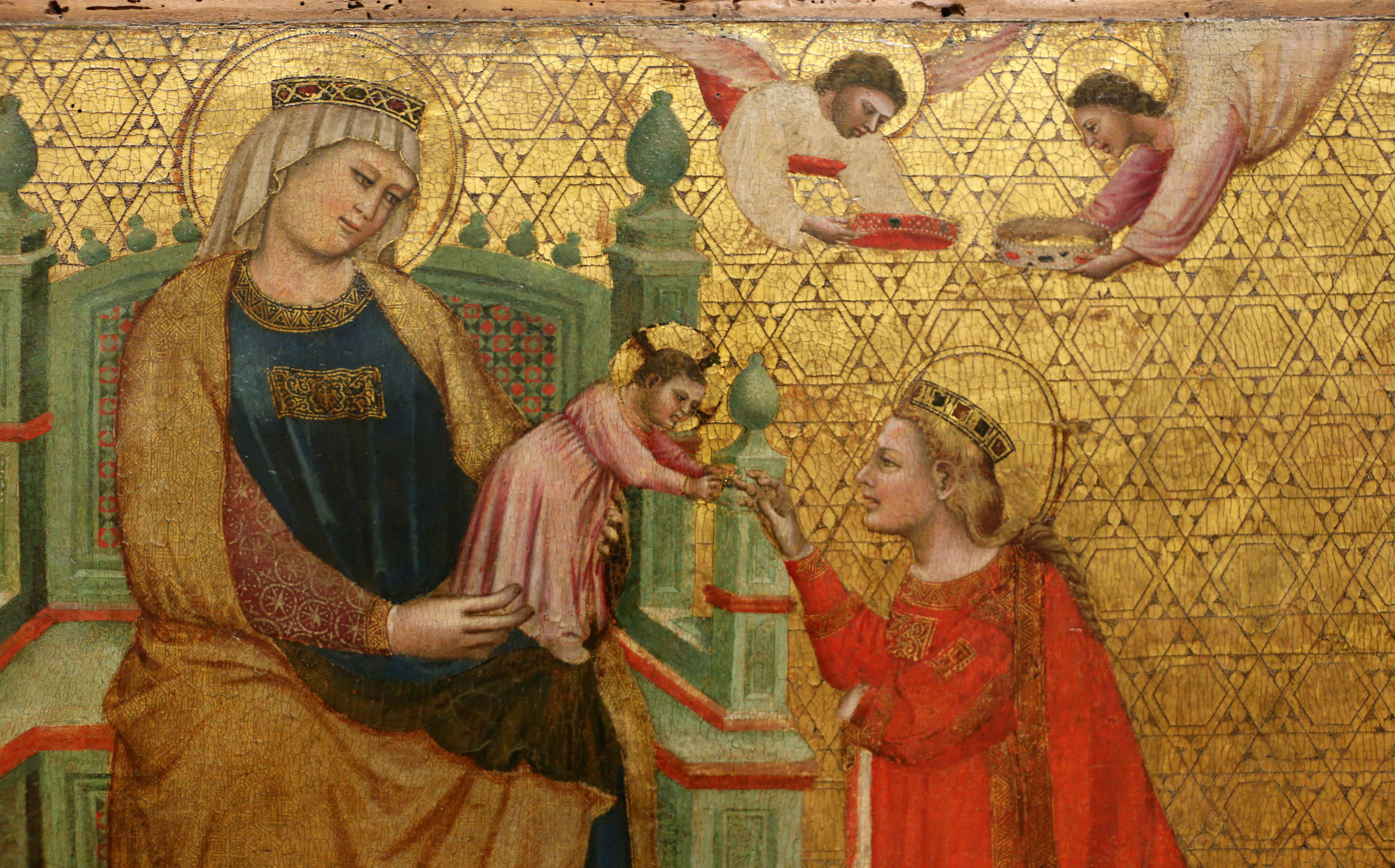
Mystical Marriage of Saint Catherine by Master of the Redeemer, c. 1310-1350

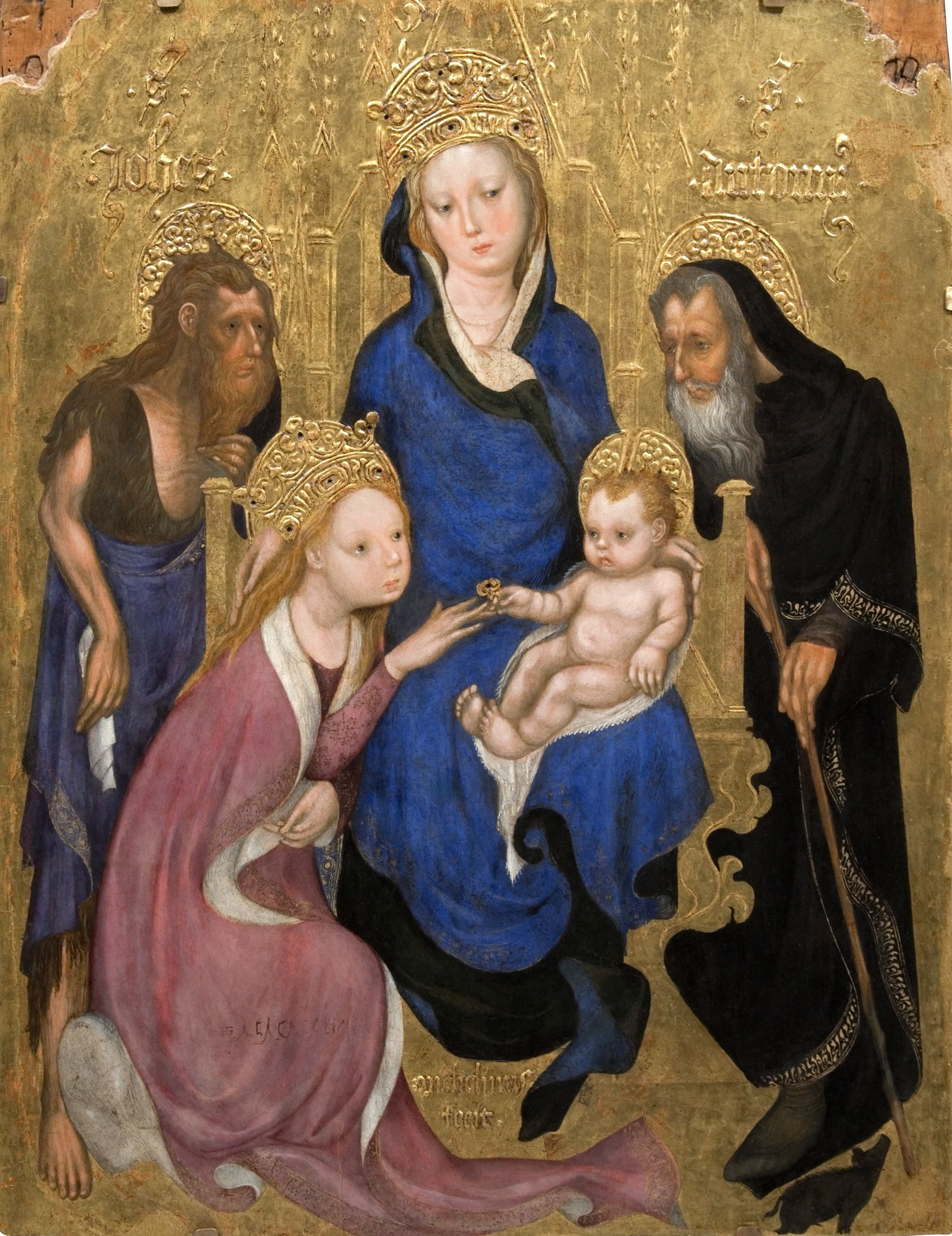
Mystical Marriage of Saint Catherine by Michelino da Besozzo, c. 1420s

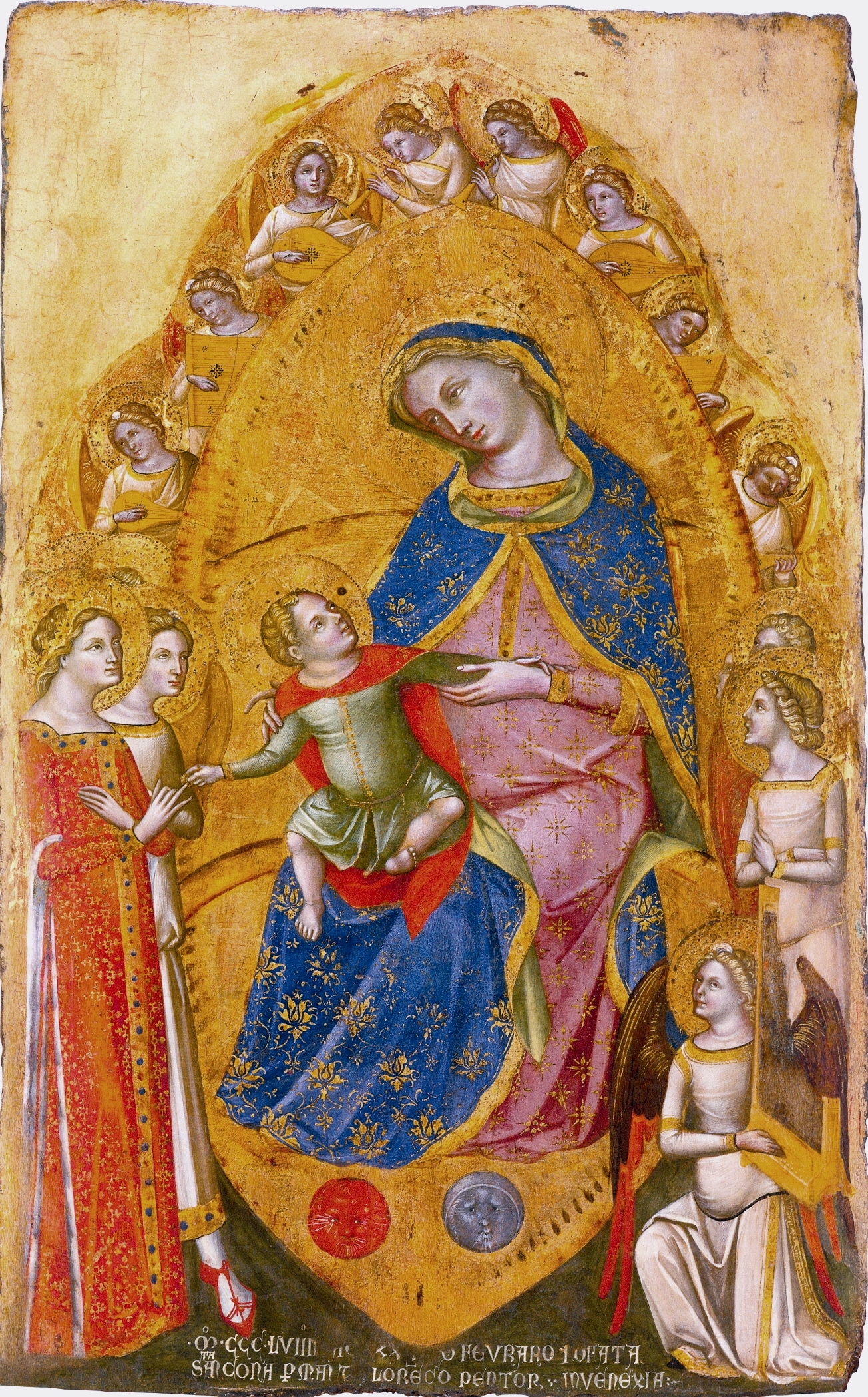
Mystical Marriage of Saint Catherine by Lorenzo Veneziano, c. 1360

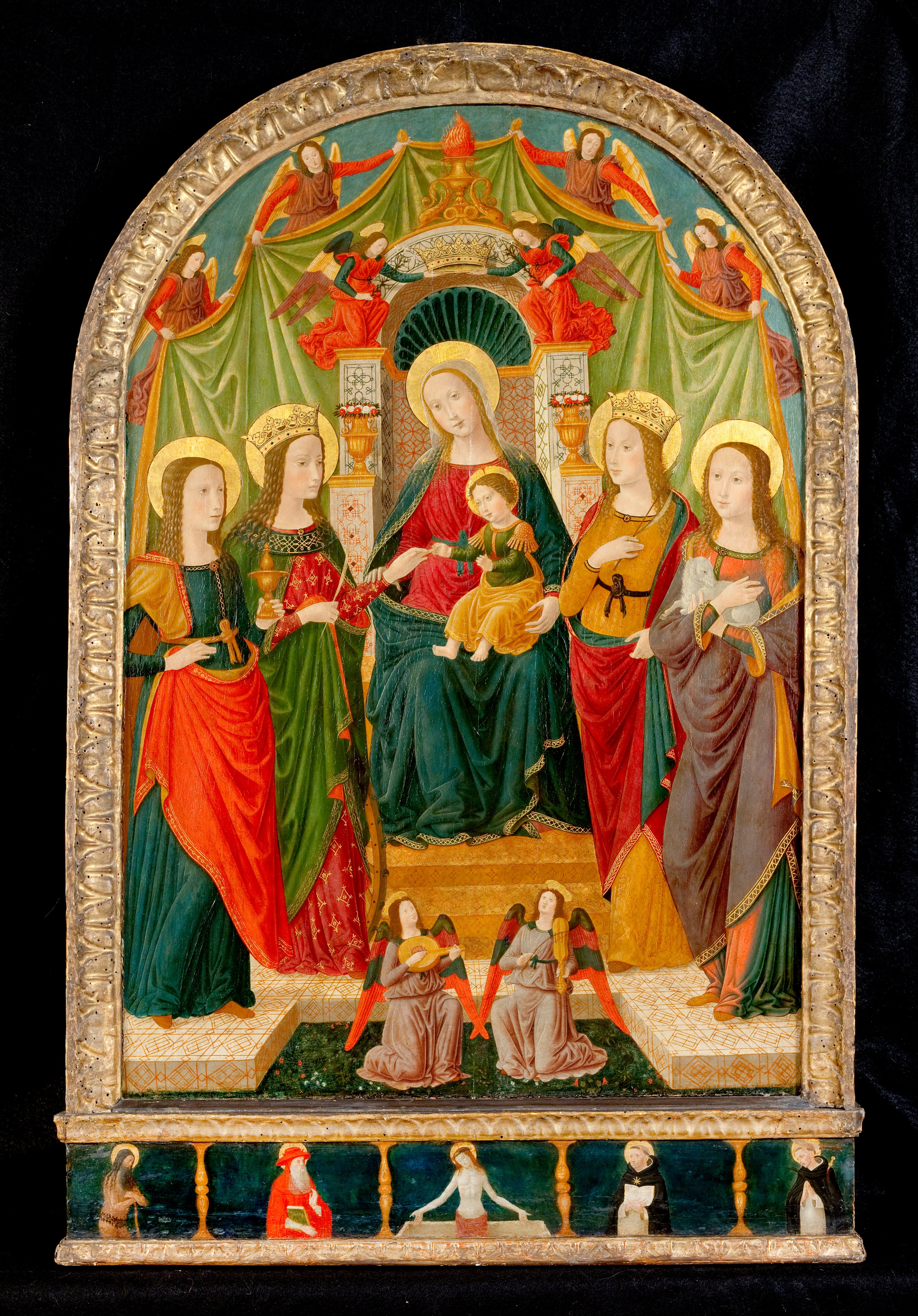
Mystical Marriage of Saint Catherine by Workshop of Benozzo Gozzoli c. 1500

== Bibliography ==
- Hatzidakis, Manolis; Drakopoulou, Evgenia (1997). Έλληνες Ζωγράφοι μετά την Άλωση (1450-1830). Τόμος 2: Καβαλλάρος - Ψαθόπουλος [Greek Painters after the Fall of Constantinople (1450-1830). Volume 2: Kavallaros - Psathopoulos]. Athens: Center for Modern Greek Studies, National Research Foundation. hdl:10442/14088. ISBN 960-7916-00-X.
- Clugnet, Léon (1908). "St. Catherine of Alexandria" . In Herbermann, Charles (ed.). Catholic Encyclopedia. Vol. 3. New York: Robert Appleton Company.
- Gregory, Rabia (2016). Marrying Jesus in Medieval and Early Modern Northern Europe Popular Culture and Religious Reform. Milton Park, UK: Taylor & Francis. ISBN 9781317100201.
- Walsh, Christine (2017). The Cult of St Katherine of Alexandria in Early Medieval Europe. Milton Park, UK: Taylor & Francis. ISBN 9781351892001.
