= The Last Judgement Triptych (Klontzas) =

Painting by Georgios Klontzas

The Last Judgment Triptych
- Τρίπτυχο Δευτέρα Παρουσία (Greek), Il Giudizio Universale (Italian)
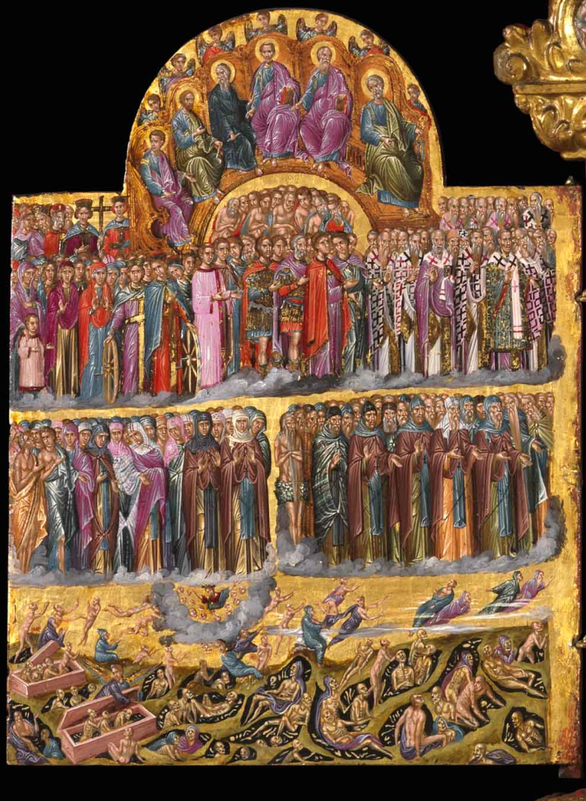
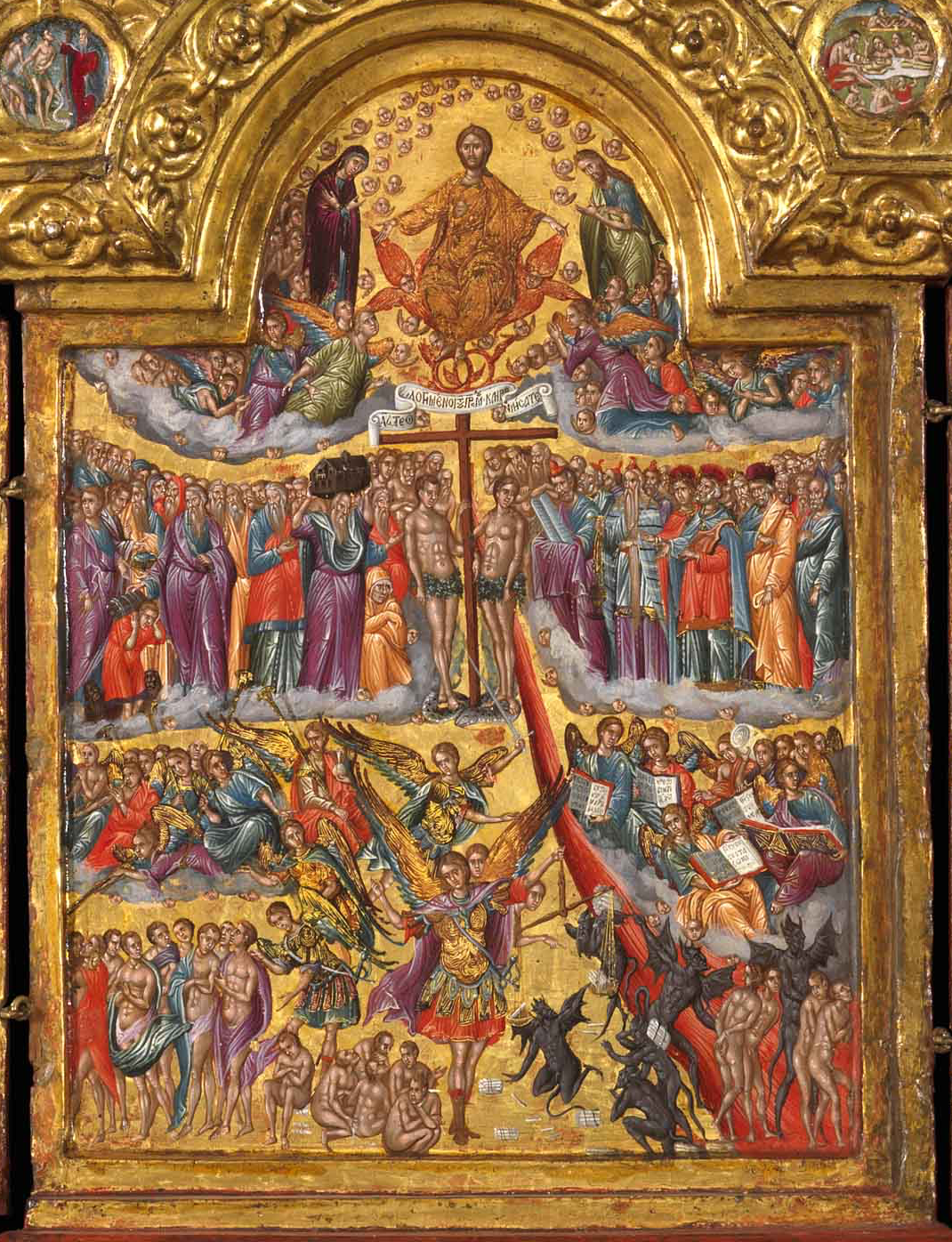
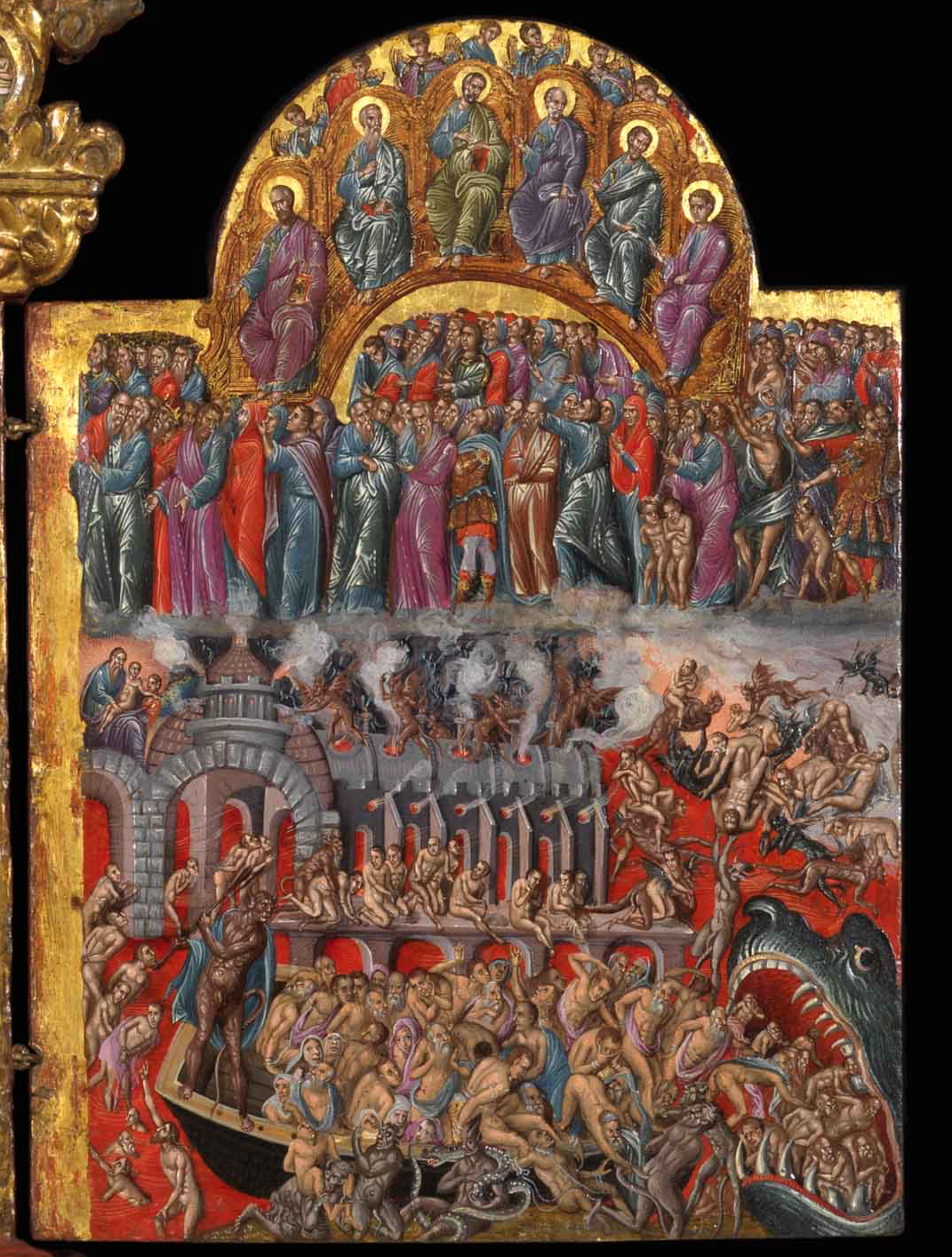
- Artist: Georgios Klontzas
- Year: c. 1560 – c. 1608
- Medium: gold enamel, egg tempera, gold leaf on wood
- Movement: Cretan School
- Subject: The Last Judgement
- Dimensions: 67 cm × 26.4 cm (79 in × 31.1 in)
- Location: Hellenic Institute of Venice; Venice
- Owner: Hellenic Institute of Venice
- Website: Official Website (Greek)

The Last Judgement Triptych is a triptych by Georgios Klontzas. Klontzas was a post-Byzantine Greek painter and prominent member of the Cretan school. He is likened to El Greco and Michael Damaskinos. He painted between 1550 and 1608, with a workshop in Heraklion, Crete. He created many forms of art such as triptychs, portable icons or paintings, and manuscripts. Klontzas created several versions of the Last Judgment or Second Coming. His The Last Judgment also features the same subject but is a single panel painting, not a triptych. Klontzas also created other triptychs.

The final and infinite judgment by God is believed to be the Second Coming. People of every nation will be judged resulting in the approval of some and the penalizing of others. This triptych is a pictorial representation of that event. Greek and Italian Byzantine artists used the theme in countless works of art. The Italian artist Fra Angelico created many triptychs of The Last Judgement. Klontzas may have been exposed to Italian prototypes. Both the triptych and The Last Judgement are in the collection of the Hellenic Institute of Venice in Italy.

== Description ==
The triptych was gilded with gold, the painting material was egg tempera and gold leaf on three separate wood panels. The width is 79 cm (31.1 in) and the height is 67 cm (26.4 in). The gilded metallic portion was made with elaborate decorations. Throughout the three panels, naked figures are mixed with nobility and clergy. Klontzas makes a distinction between the saved and the damned. All Twelve Apostles are visible in the left and right panel.

On the first panel to the viewer's left in the upper archway, six apostles are seated in heavenly thrones. Below the apostles in the first panel, Constantine I and Helena stand by the True Cross. Saint Catherine stands by the wooden wheel. The remaining figures participate in the dance of the last judgment. The hierarchs, military saints, monks, and holy women are present. At the bottom of the panel, a scene depicts the resurrection of the dead.

On the second panel, below the holy trio, Adam and Eve hold the cross as they gaze upon hell. To the right of the cross, Noah carries the Ark over his head; to the left of the cross, Moses is holding the Ten Commandments. On the same side as Noah, Abraham, and Isaac are present. Isaac carries the wood of sacrifice on his back. He is escorted by two lions. Below the group, there is the Angelic Choir playing instruments, and the Book of Life is opened. Two archangels appear at the center bottom of the image: Archangel Michael holds a scale depicting the weighing of souls, and Archangel Gabriel, positioned behind Archangel Michael, has a sword. Winged demons are also present. The demon characters resemble his other works, namely The Last Judgment. The upper portion features scenes from Genesis in fifteen small circles. In the central upper archway, right below the scenes of Genesis, Jesus appears, the Virgin Mary is to his right, and John the Baptist appears to his left, resembling The Last Judgment painting of Klontzas. The trio is surrounded by flying heads.

On the third panel to the viewer's right, the upper archway features the remaining six apostles. Below the apostles, clergy, and nobles, a huge scene depicting hell occupies over half of the panel. Abraham, Lazarus, and Isaac sit on top of a stone building, which is crowded with demons. A figure reminiscent of Greek mythology resembling Charon appears. A wooden boat carries the damned to the mouth of hell.

== Gallery ==
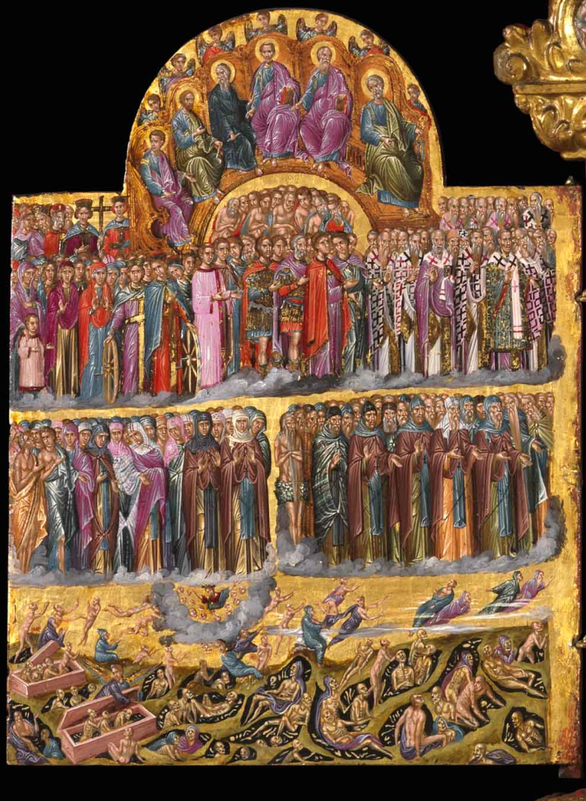
Detail of panel 1

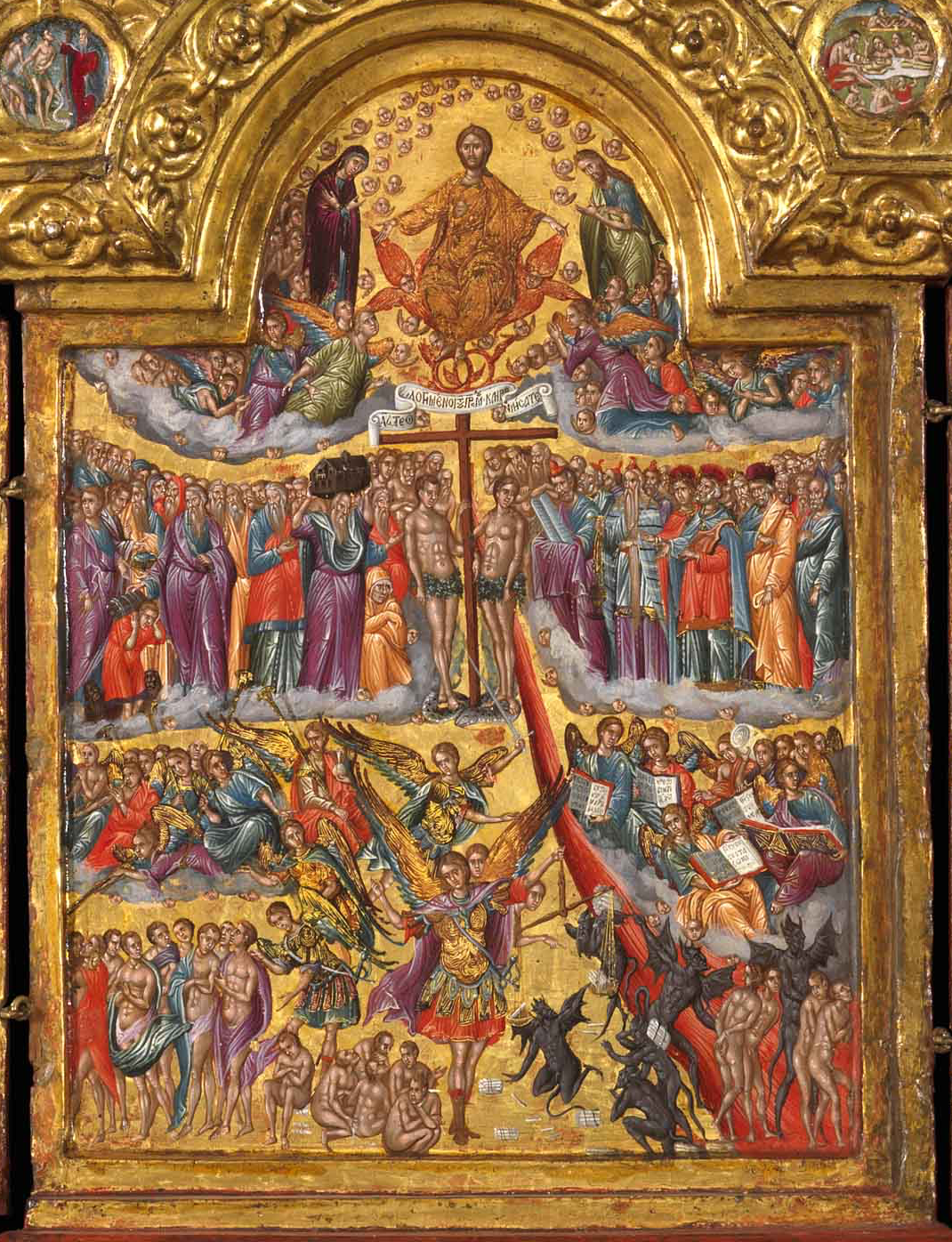
Detail of panel 2

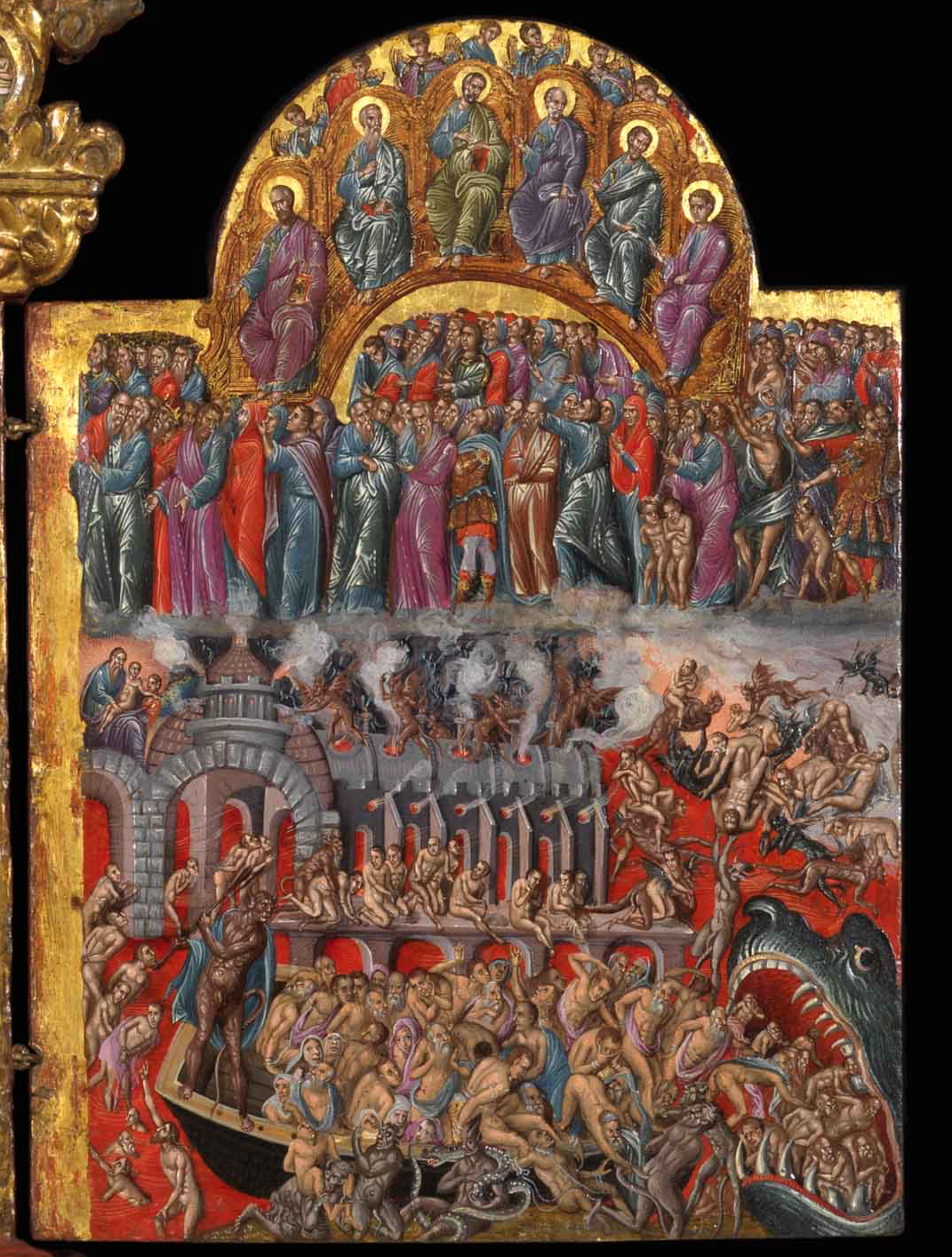
Detail of panel 3
