= The Miracle of the Holy Belt =

Painting by Theodore Poulakis

- Θαύμα της Aγίας Ζώνης (Greek), La Sacra Cintola (Italian)
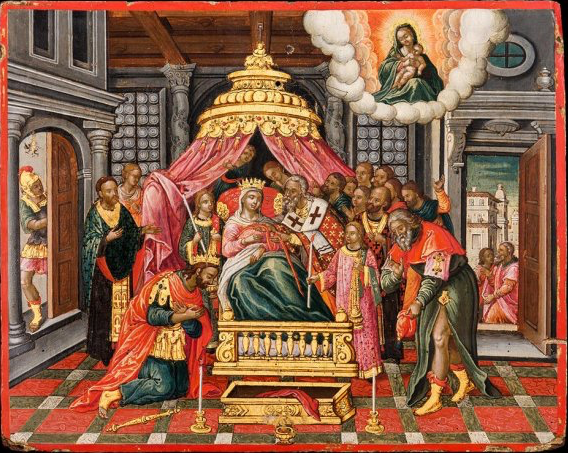
- Artist: Theodore Poulakis
- Year: c. 1642–1692
- Medium: tempera on wood
- Movement: Heptanese School
- Subject: The Miracle of the Holy Belt, Girdle of Thomas
- Dimensions: 39.7 cm × 49.5 cm (15.6 in × 19.4 in)
- Location: Benaki Museum, Athens, Greece
- Owner: Benaki Museum
- Accession: ΓΕ 3027
- Website: Official Website

The Miracle of the Holy Belt was completed by Theodore Poulakis. He was a Greek painter originally from the village of Chania, Crete. He was associated with the Cretan School. He eventually migrated to the Ionian Islands. He was a member of the Heptanese School. He settled on the island of Corfu. He was a famous teacher. He signed a six-year contract to teach painting to Marinos Damistras son Tzorzi. The contract stipulated that his student had to follow him to Venice. Poulakis frequently traveled all over the Venetian Empire. During one period of his life, he stayed in Venice for over 13 years. He was very active within the painting community. He was also involved with the prestigious quarantia council. One hundred thirty of his work survived. The Girdle of Thomas also referred to as the miracle of the holy belt is a sacred relic located at Prato Cathedral in Tuscany, Italy.

According to legend, a knotted textile cord fell from the heavens to Saint Thomas the Apostle around the time of the Assumption of Mary. Saint Thomas missed the post-resurrection of the holy spirit, and he was doubting the event. He also missed the Assumption of Mary and the Virgin sent the Girdle of Thomas as proof to doubting Thomas. Poulaki depicted the holy belt in his painting. Poulaki's paintings were heavily influenced by French and Flemish engravings circulating the Venetian Empire. Most of the Greek community embraced Jan Sadeler I. The Miracle of the Holy Belt resembles an engraving completed by Flemish painter and print designer Chrispijn van den Broeck. Poulaki's works such as The Fall of Man and In Thee Rejoiceth were influenced by Étienne Delaune. His work began to reflect French and Flemish attributes not reflective of the maniera greca or Venetian painting. The artist absorbed the stylistic characteristics of Flemish and French painting. The Miracle of the Holy Belt is an example of the artist's knowledge of both styles. He also integrated Cretan Renaissance painting. The work of art is housed at the Benaki Museum.

== Description ==
The work of art is made of egg tempera on wood. The height is 39.7 cm (15.6 in) and the width is 49.5 cm (19.4 in). The orientation of the painting illustrates the artist's comfort with painting works similar to French and Flemish engravings. He used the same method in his The Nativity of Christ. The artist also reveals his knowledge of Michael Damaskinos's tiled floors. An example of floor tiling is in his The Last Supper . The style was also adopted by Greek painter Emmanuel Tzanes in his portrayal of Saint Mark. The crowned Virgin is the central figure and she is on her deathbed, the Mircle of the Holy Belt takes place during the same time as the Assumption of Mary. Thomas missed the Assumption of Mary because he was on his way back from India. The Virgin Mary aware of Thomas' sceptical nature, appeared to him individually and dropped the girdle she was wearing to Thomas, to give him physical proof of what he had seen. The legend was inspired by doubting Thomas missing the post-Resurrection appearance of Jesus to the ten other apostles. Two children hold the traditional religious thymiaterion and a candle. Three religious figures are present, the Virgin Mary presents the holy belt to Thomas. A saint kneels before the Virgin and his leg appears. The artist attempts to reveal human naturalism. The room is lavishly ornamented with gold. An empty casket appears at the foot of the bed, the work is similar to the Miracle of the Holy Belt by Emmanuel Tzanes. The painting features exuberant patterns, radiant colors, and ostentatious costumes. The artist creates a three-dimensional scene filled with majestic splendor. A soldier peaks into a doorway inlaid with ancient Greek columns. The soldier is dressed in lavish attire. Two other figures appear to our right outside of a second doorway. Multiple structures emerge in the background beneath a beautiful blue sky. On the ceiling of the room, the Virgin appears a second time within a celestial aura holding the infant Jesus. The aura also features a three-dimensional layer of clouds. The different objects spread around the room demonstrate the artist's attempt to create a multi-dimensional environment.

== Gallery ==
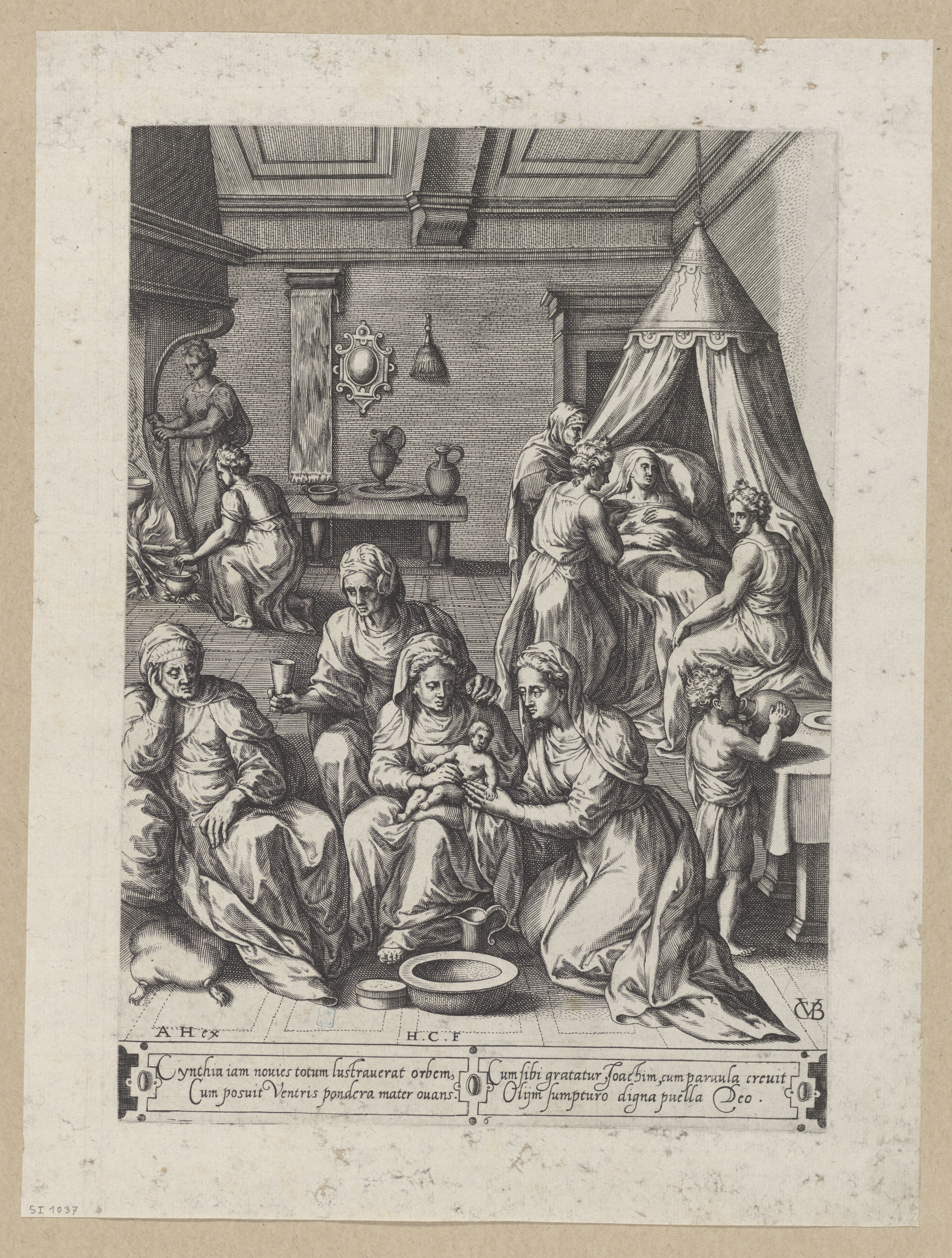
The Nativity of the Virgin by Chrispijn van den Broeck

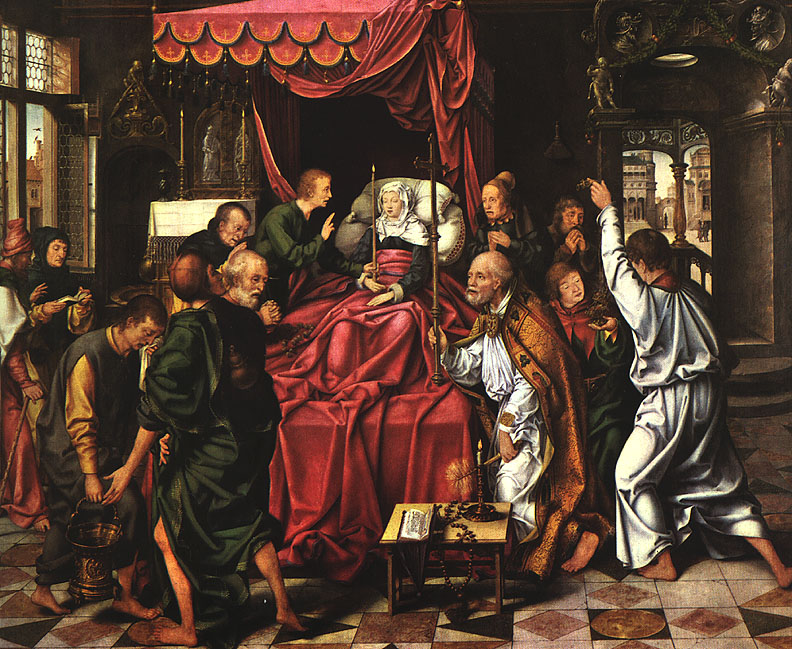
The Death of the Virgin by Joos van Cleve

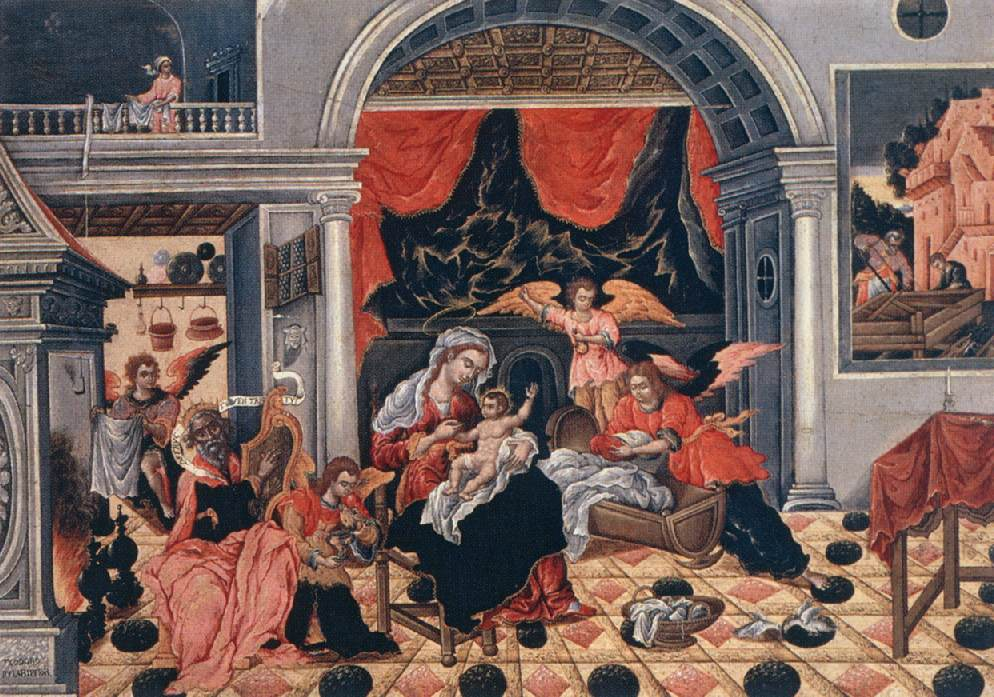
The Nativity of Christ Poulakis

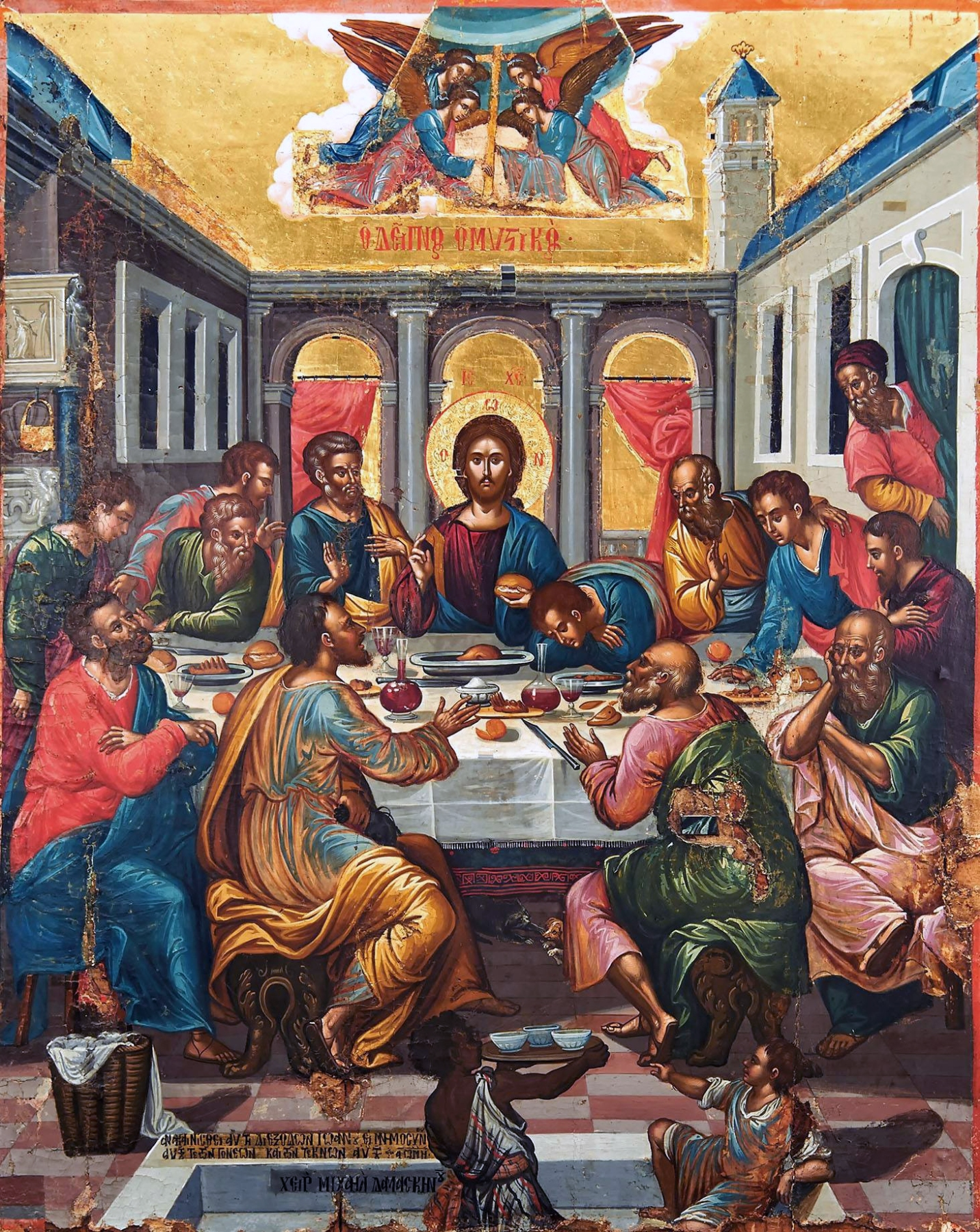
tiled floor example Damaskinos

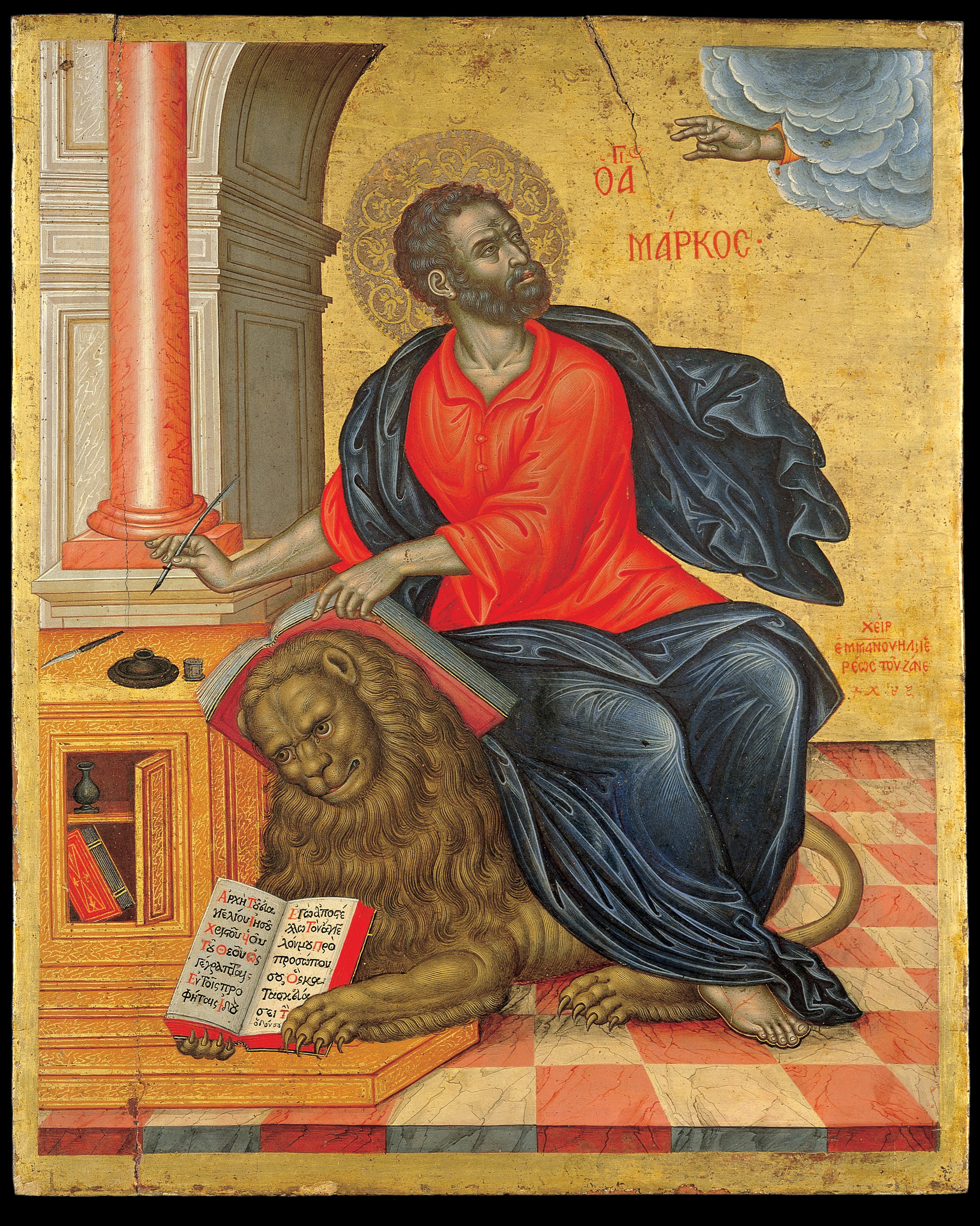
tiled floor example Tzanes

=== Similar Works ===
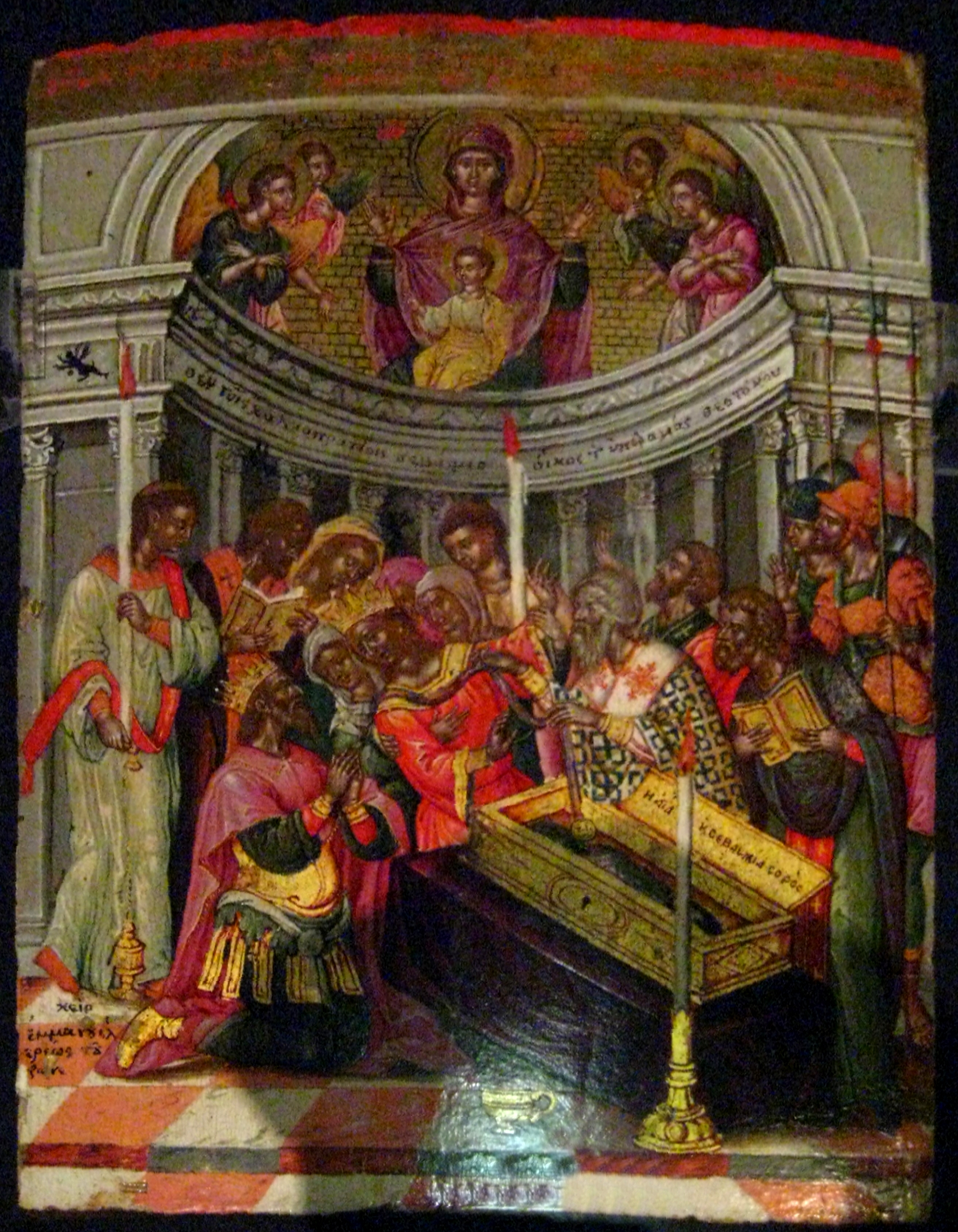
Miracle of Holy Belt Tzanes

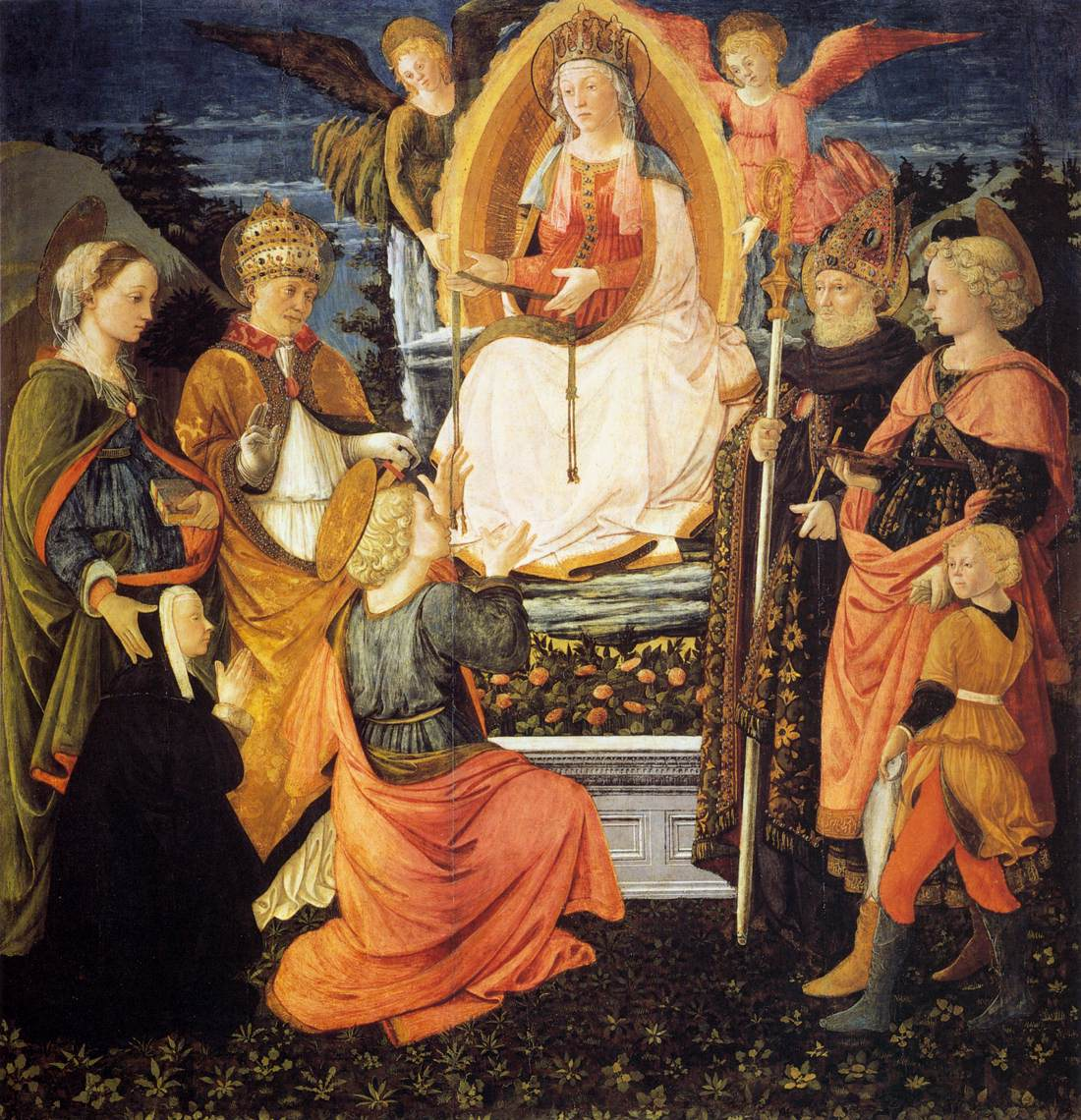
Filippo Lippi, Madonna della Cintola, 1455–1465, Prato

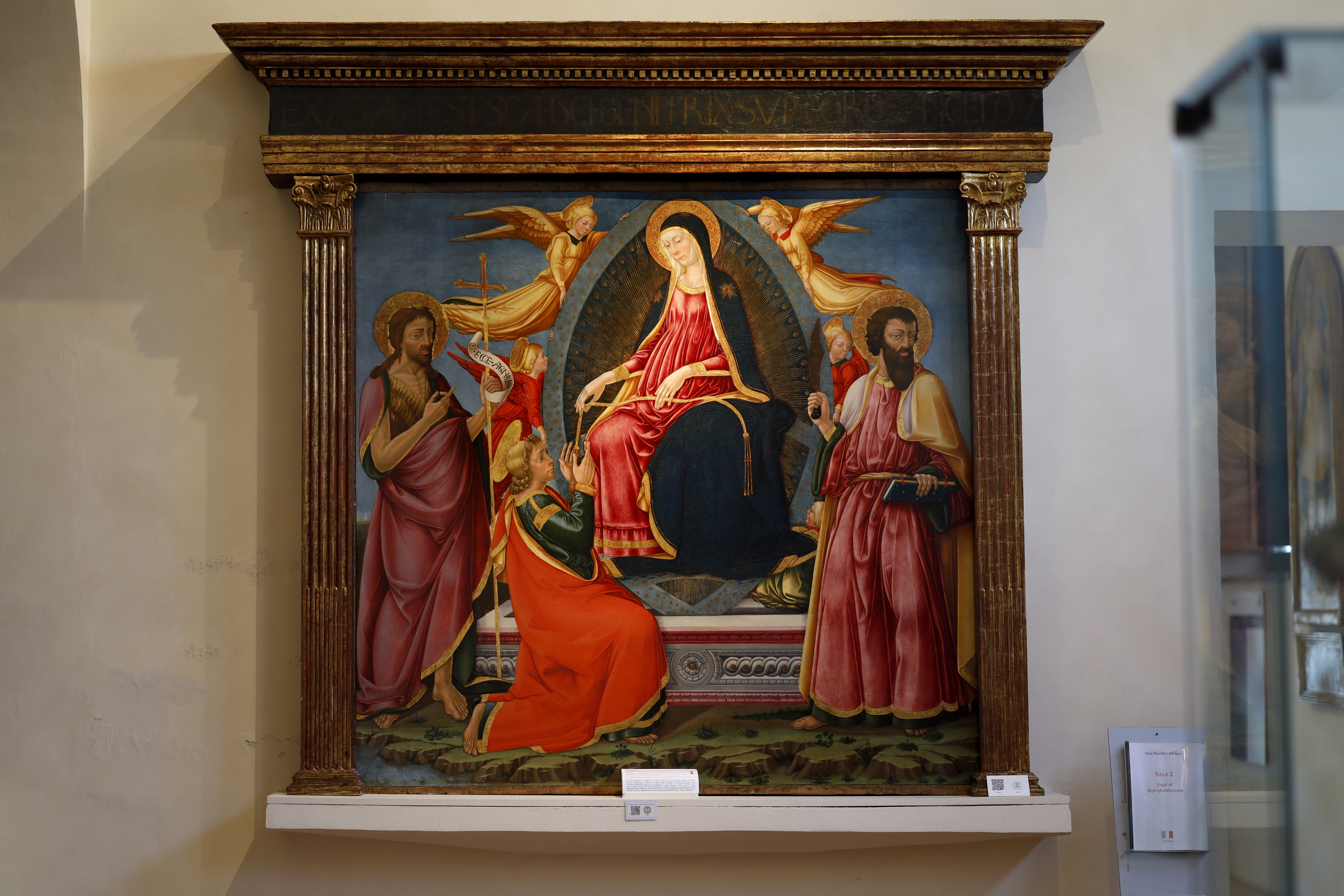
Madonna enthroned handing Saint Thomas her girdle

== See also ==
- Holy Girdle
- Mérode Altarpiece

== Bibliography ==
- "Cassidy (1991)": Cassidy, Brendan, "A Relic, Some Pictures and the Mothers of Florence in the Late Fourteenth Century", Gesta, Vol. 30, No. 2 (1991), pp. 91–99, The University of Chicago Press on behalf of the International Center of Medieval Art, JSTOR
- Rylands, Philip, "Palma Vecchio's 'Assumption of the Virgin'", The Burlington Magazine, Vol. 119, No. 889, (Apr., 1977), pp. 244–250, JSTOR
- Crowe, Joseph Archer; Cavalcaselle, Giovanni Battista (1903). A History of Painting in Italy: Giotto and the Giottesques. New York, NY: Charles Scribner's Sons.
