= Theodore Poulakis =

Greek painter (1622–1692)

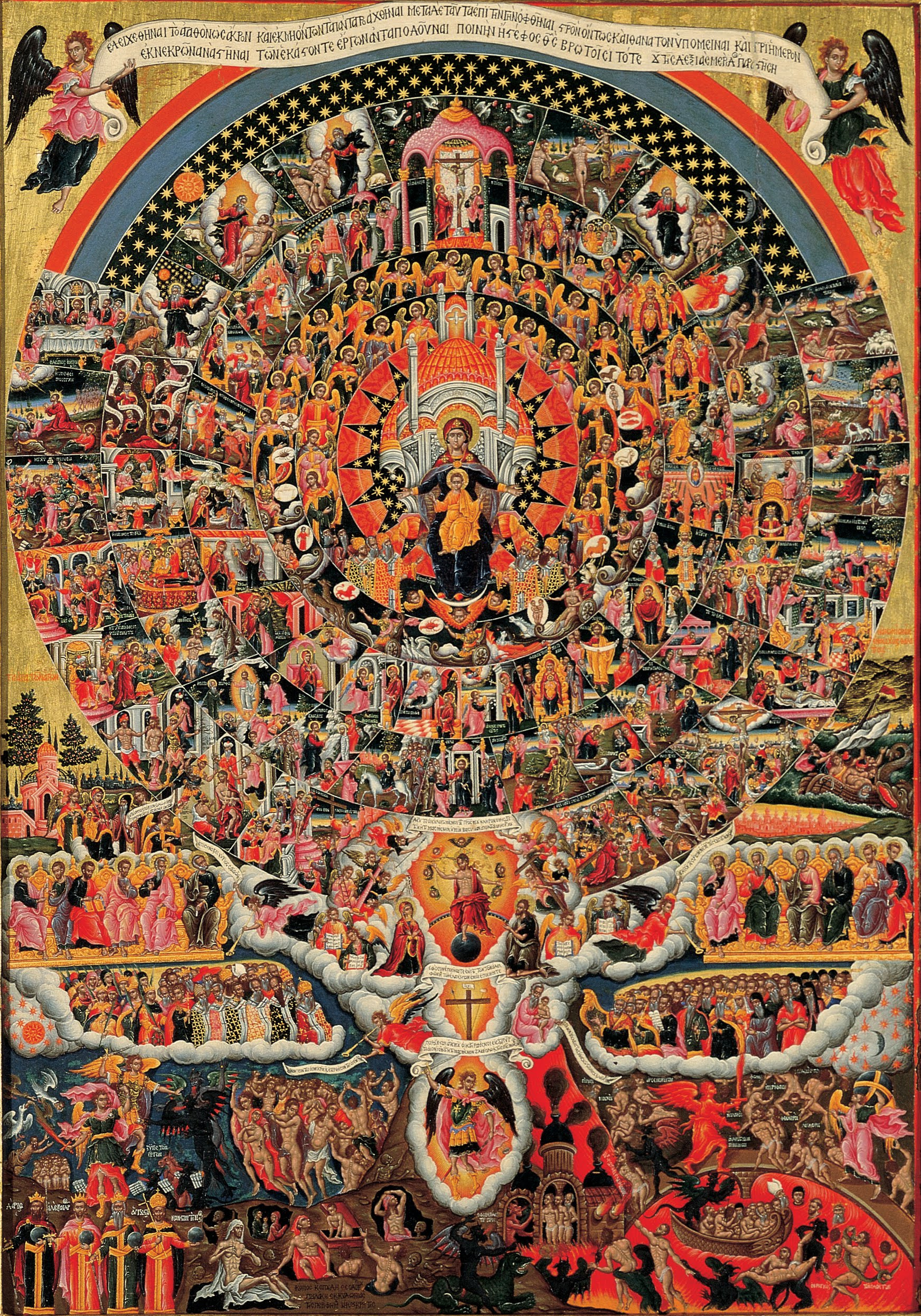
- Hymn to the Virgin
- Born: 1622; Chania, Republic of Venice
- Died: 1692 (aged 69–70); Corfu, Ionian Islands, Republic of Venice
- Known for: Iconography and hagiography
- Notable work: St. John the Baptist; St. Spyridon and scenes from his life The Nativity of Christ
- Movement: Cretan school Heptanese school

Theodore Poulakis (Greek: Θεόδωρος Πουλάκης; 1622–1692) was a Greek Renaissance painter and teacher. He is considered the father of the Heptanese school and one of the most prolific painters of Venetian Crete. Poulakis was a member of the Cretan school, his contemporary was Emmanuel Tzanes. Emmanuel Tzanes and Poulakis were active painters of the Cretan School until Candia, went to war with the Ottomans around 1649. Candia finally fell after twenty years of siege in 1669. Poulakis settled on the island of Corfu. Stephanos Tzangarolas was another famous painter in Corfu around the same period. Poulakis's works are likened to Andreas Pavias and Georgios Klontzas. Poulakis works exhibit qualities of the Venetian school. Over 130 of his paintings have survived and can be found all over the world.

== History ==
Poulakis was born in Chania Crete. He was the son of Antonios. He was married and had two children Vittirous and Eleni. By the age of twenty-four, he was living in Venice. He stayed there for thirteen years until 1657. His son was baptized in Venice in 1646 and his daughter two years later. He was a member of the Quaranta council. Famous Greek painters Philotheos Skoufos, Emmanuel Tzanes, Konstantinos Tzanes, and Ioannis Moskos were all living in Venice around that time. Poulakis was a member of the Greek Brotherhood of Venice in 1654.

In 1657, Poulakis migrated to Corfu. He signed a six-year contract to teach painting to Marinos Damistras son Tzorzi. According to the contract, Tzorzi had to follow Poulakis anywhere he went including Venice. Philotheos Skoufos was a witness for Poulakis in a legal matter around 1666. Poulakis traveled to Cephalonia where he painted. By 1671, he was back in Venice one year later he was voted a member of the Quaranta e Gionta. In 1673, he took part in a baptism. By 1675, he was back in Corfu where he lived out the remainder of his life. He died on November 16, 1692.

== Painting style ==
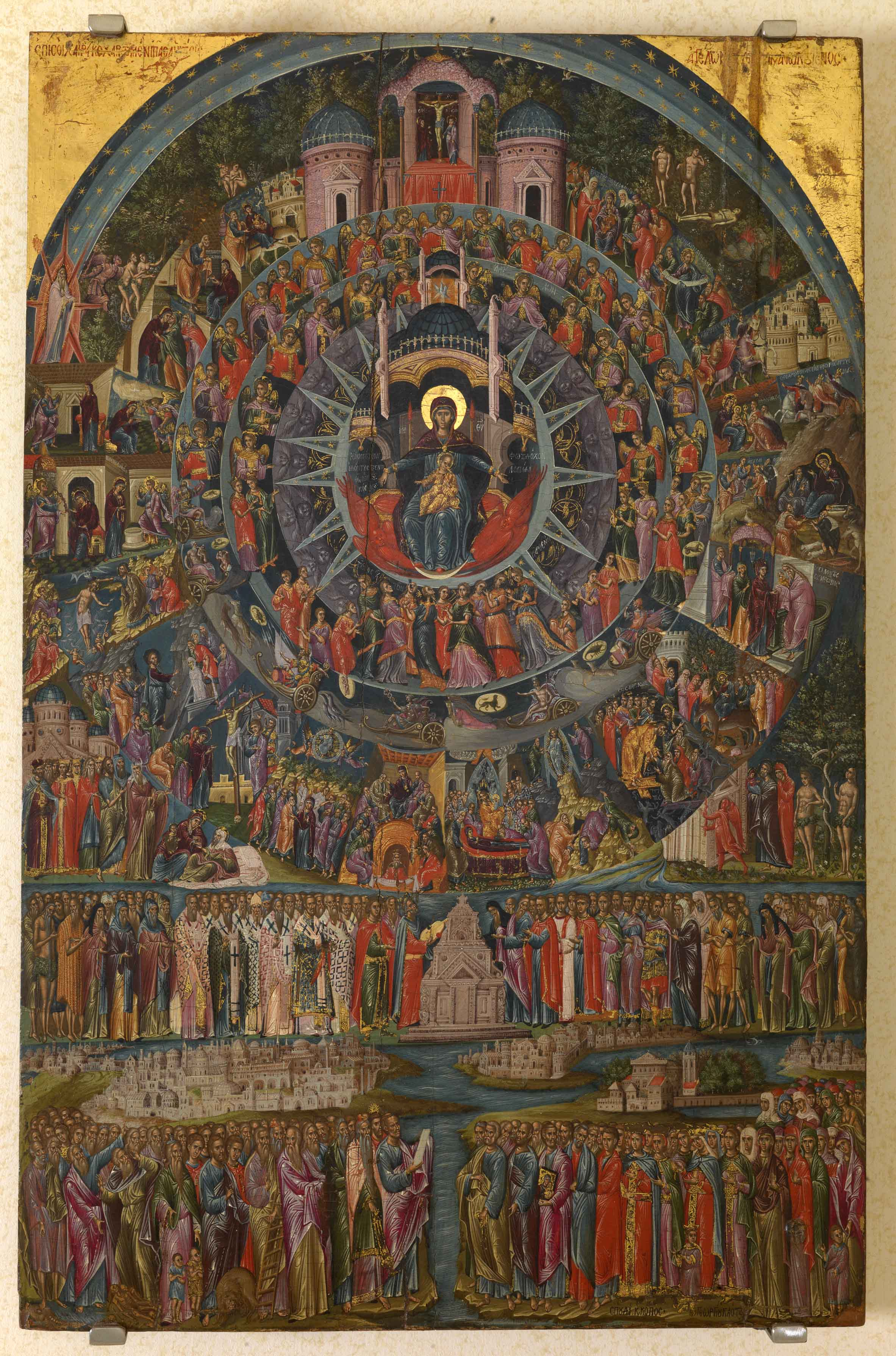
All Creation rejoices in thee, Georgios Klontzas (1530-1608)

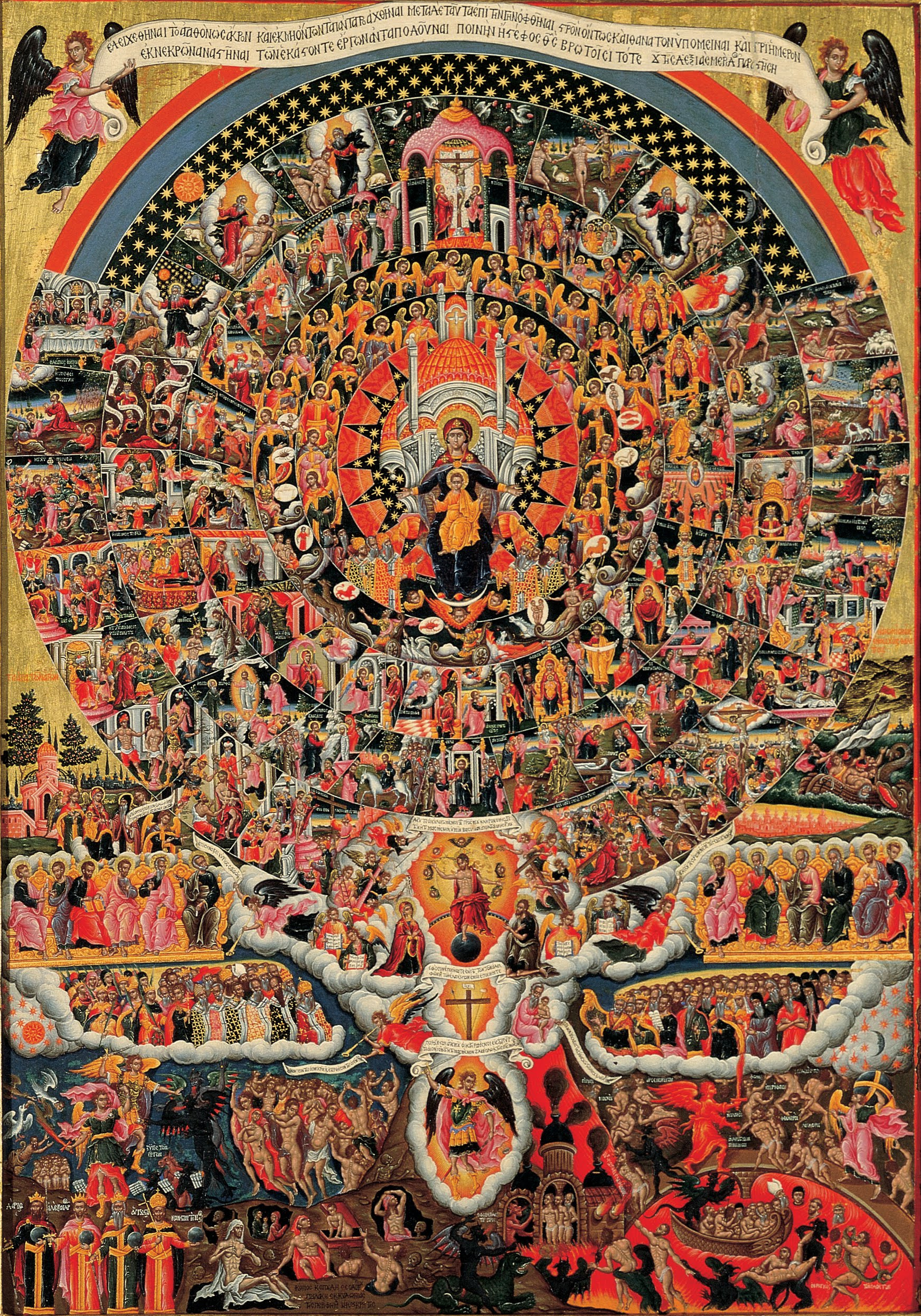
The Hymn to the Virgin, "Eπί Σοί Xαίρει In Thee Rejoiceth Theodore Poulakis

Some of his paintings escaped the traditional maniera greca and exhibit fuller shapes and variations of color. His work Hymn to the Virgin followed the Greek tradition and is comparable to Andreas Pavias Crucifixion of Jesus. Clearly, both artists try to fill the canvas with figures. Both of the paintings follow the traditional Greek style. Another painting by Greek painter Georgios Klontzas, All Creation Rejoices in Thee closely resembles Hymn to the Virgin where the virgin is at the Center of the icon and countless figures occupy the iconic space. Georgios Klontzas clearly inspired the work of Poulakis.

He is one the fathers of the Heptanese school due to his transition from painting styles. He does not always observe the traditional lines and shapes of maniera greca. His paintings Adam and Eve, Noah's Ark, and the Birth of Isaac are examples of the transitional period of the Cretan school to the more refined sophisticated art of the Heptanese school. Clearly, Michael Damaskinos experimented with this transition in his The Last Supper, and The Wedding of Cana.

Theodore Poulakis takes his viewers from the Cretan school to the Heptanese school but Michael Damaskinos began playing with the idea one hundred years before Poulakis. El Greco never successfully converted the Cretan school to his stylistic transitions. Poulakis continued painting until the time of his death.

== Gallery ==
=== Cretan School ===
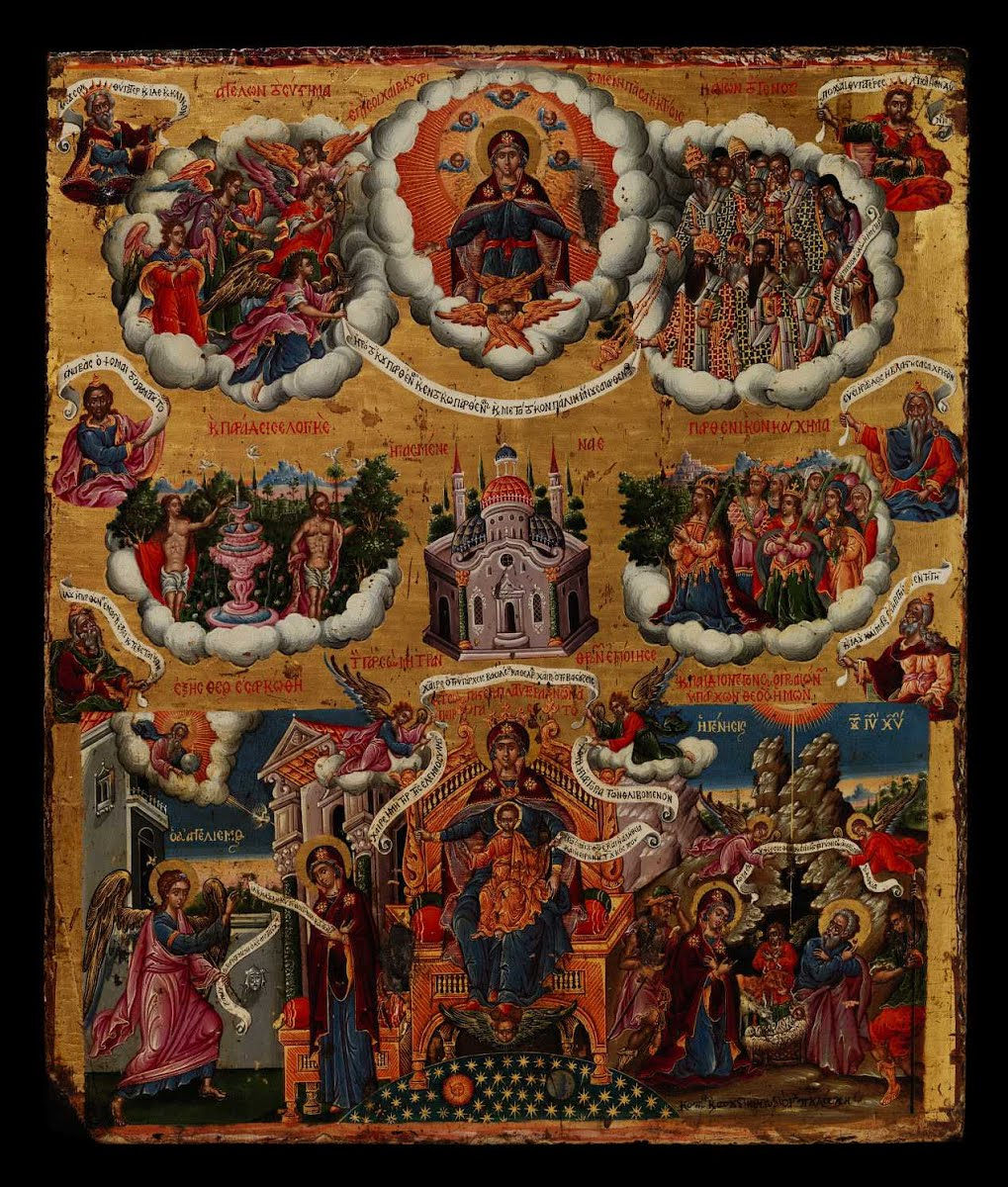
In Thee Rejoiceth

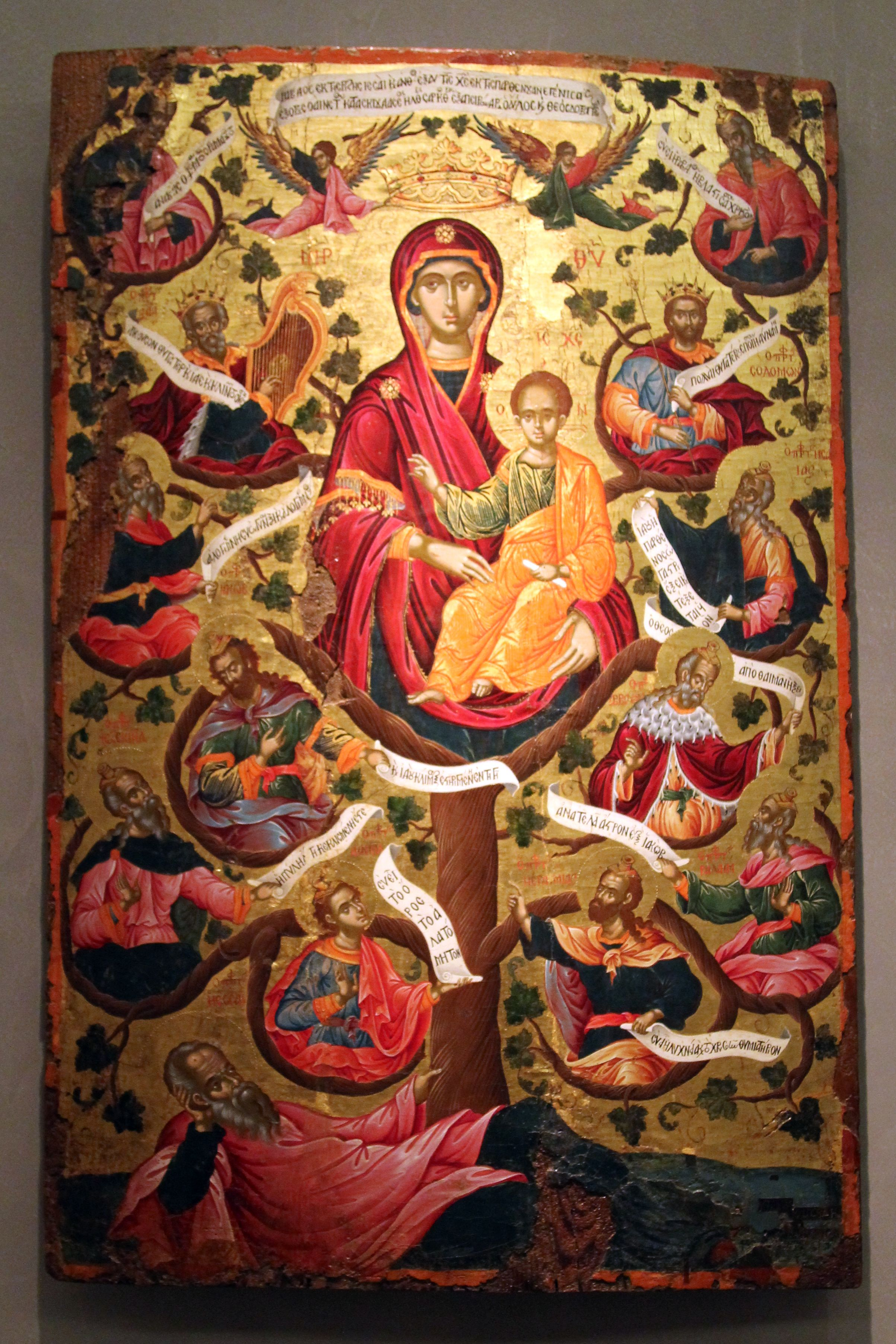
Virgin, Tree of Jesse

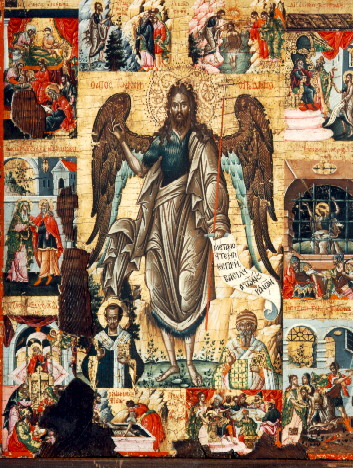
St. John the Baptist

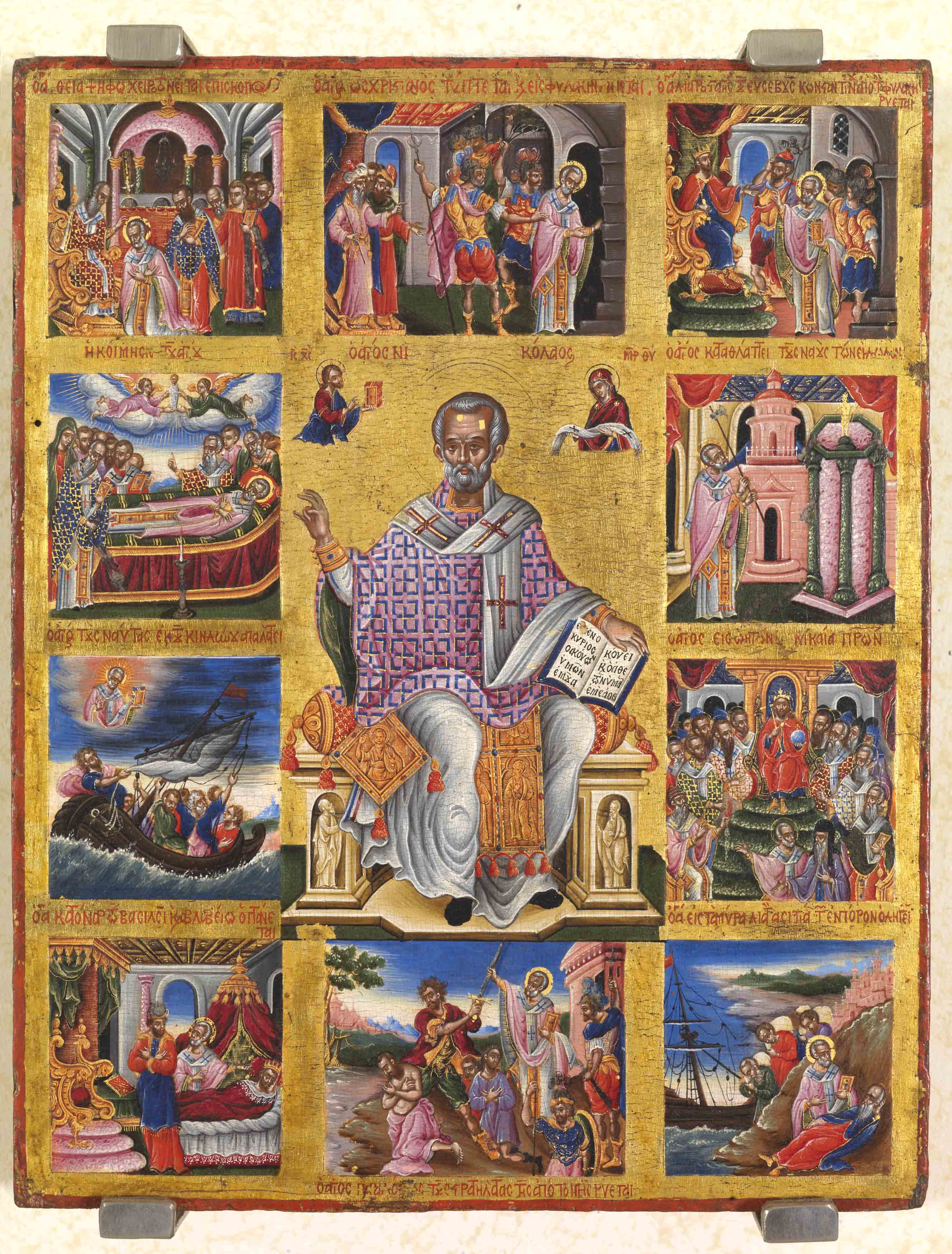
Saint Nicholas

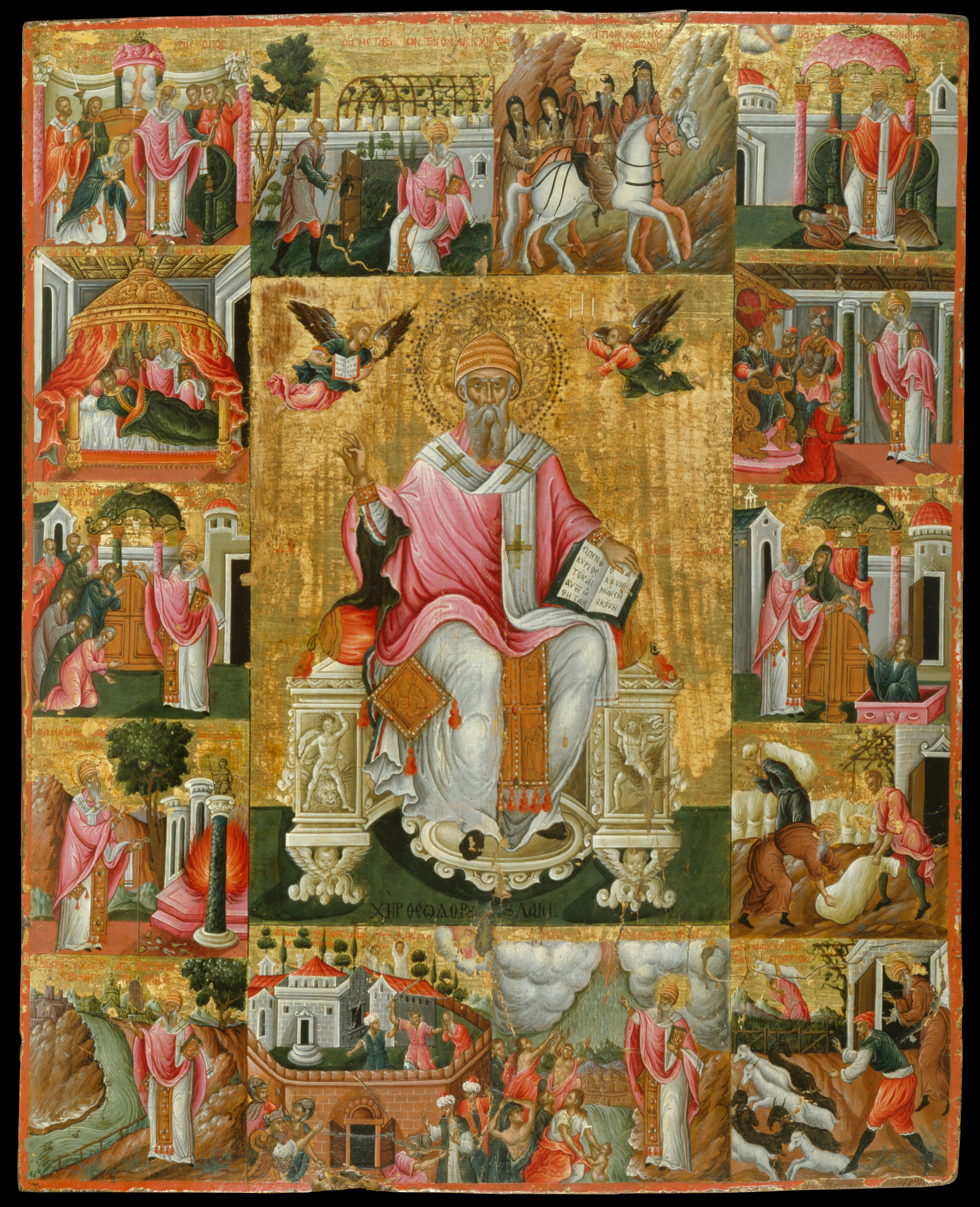
St. Spyridon and scenes from his life

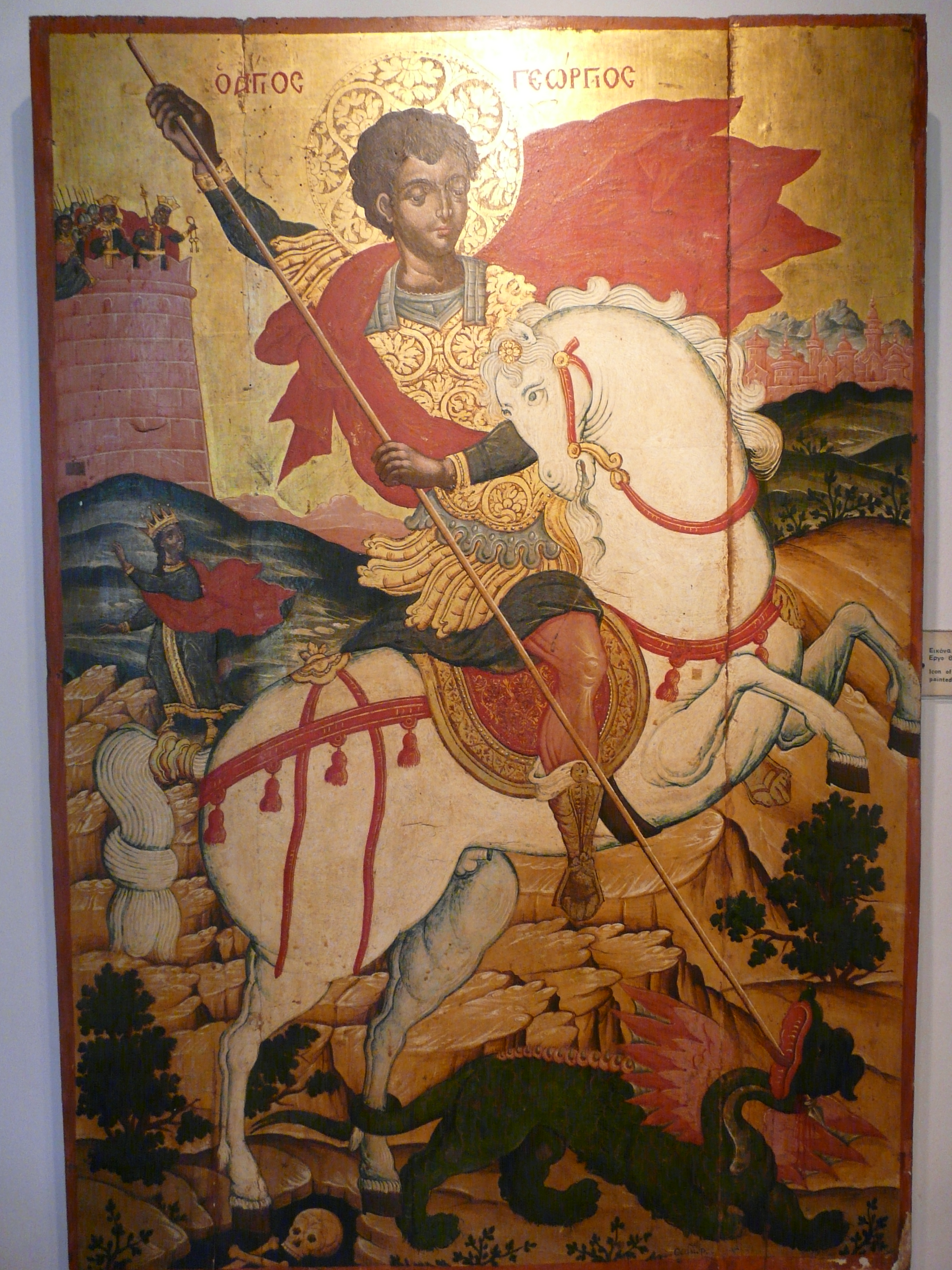
Palaiokastritsa monastery, Corfu Icon of the St. George

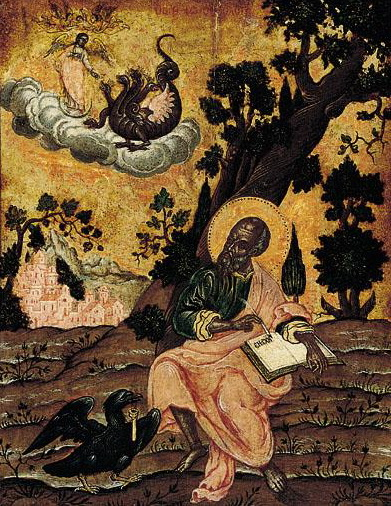
Saint John

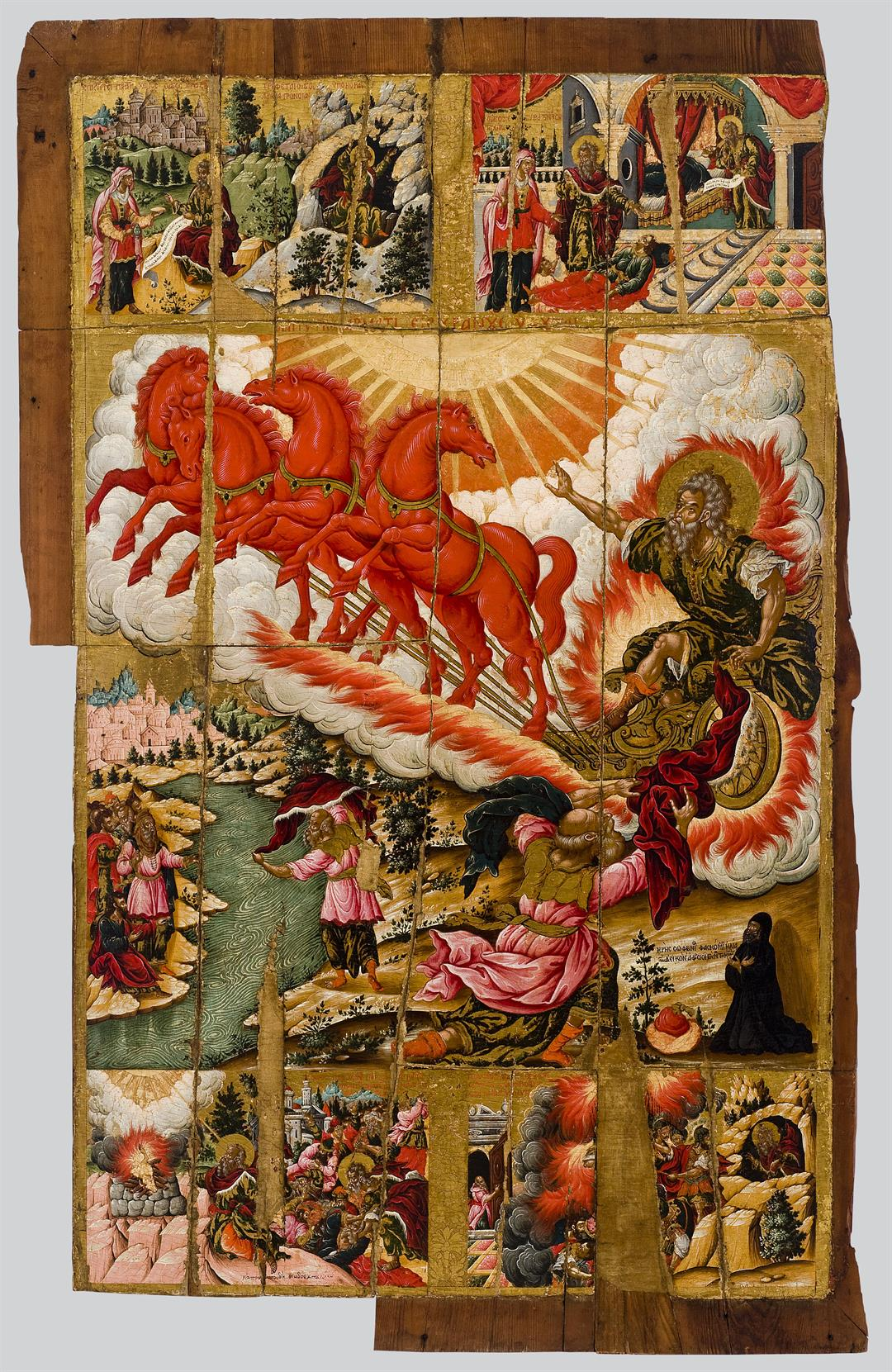
The Ascension of Prophet Elijah and Scenes from his life.

=== Heptanese School ===
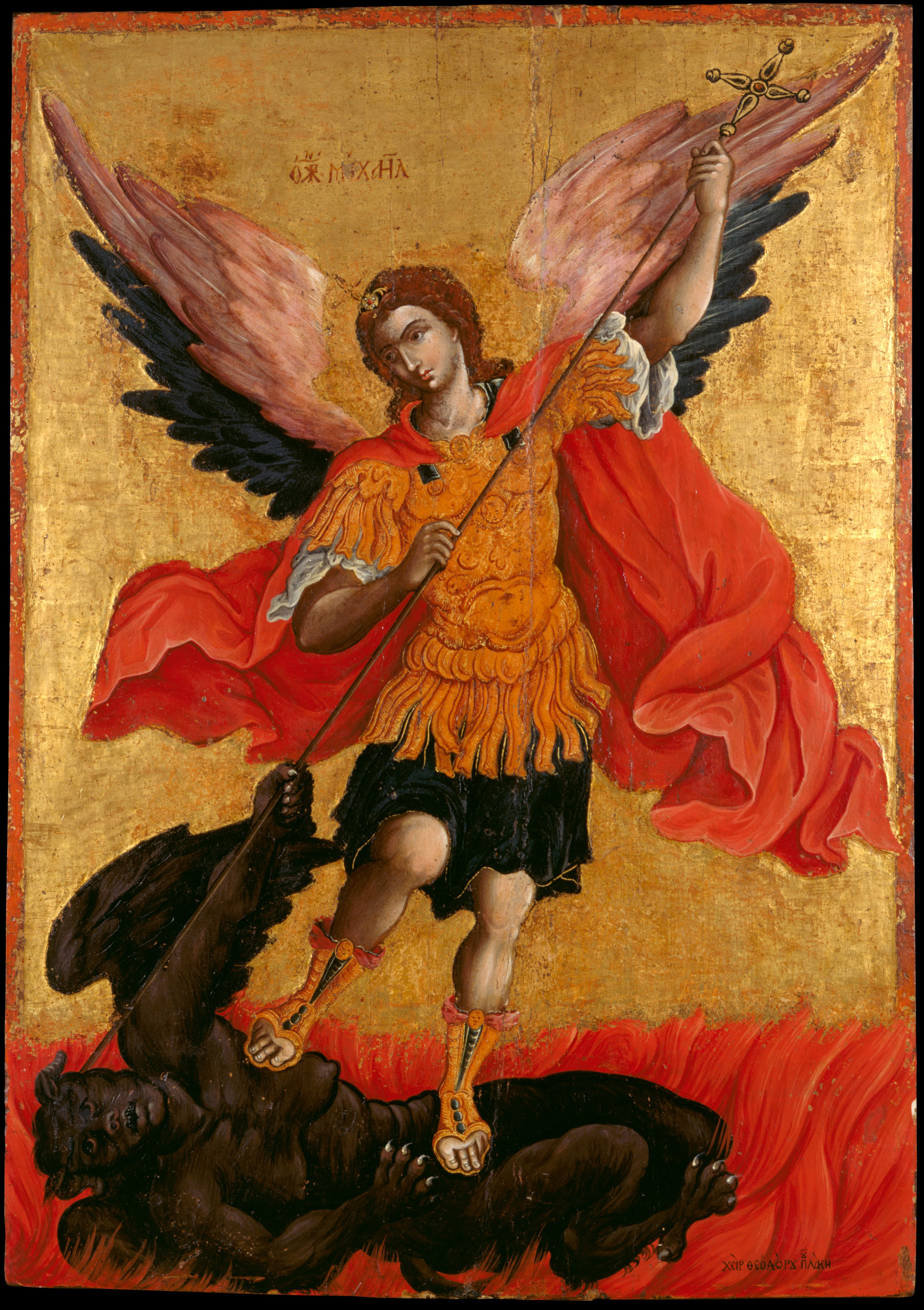
Archangel Michael

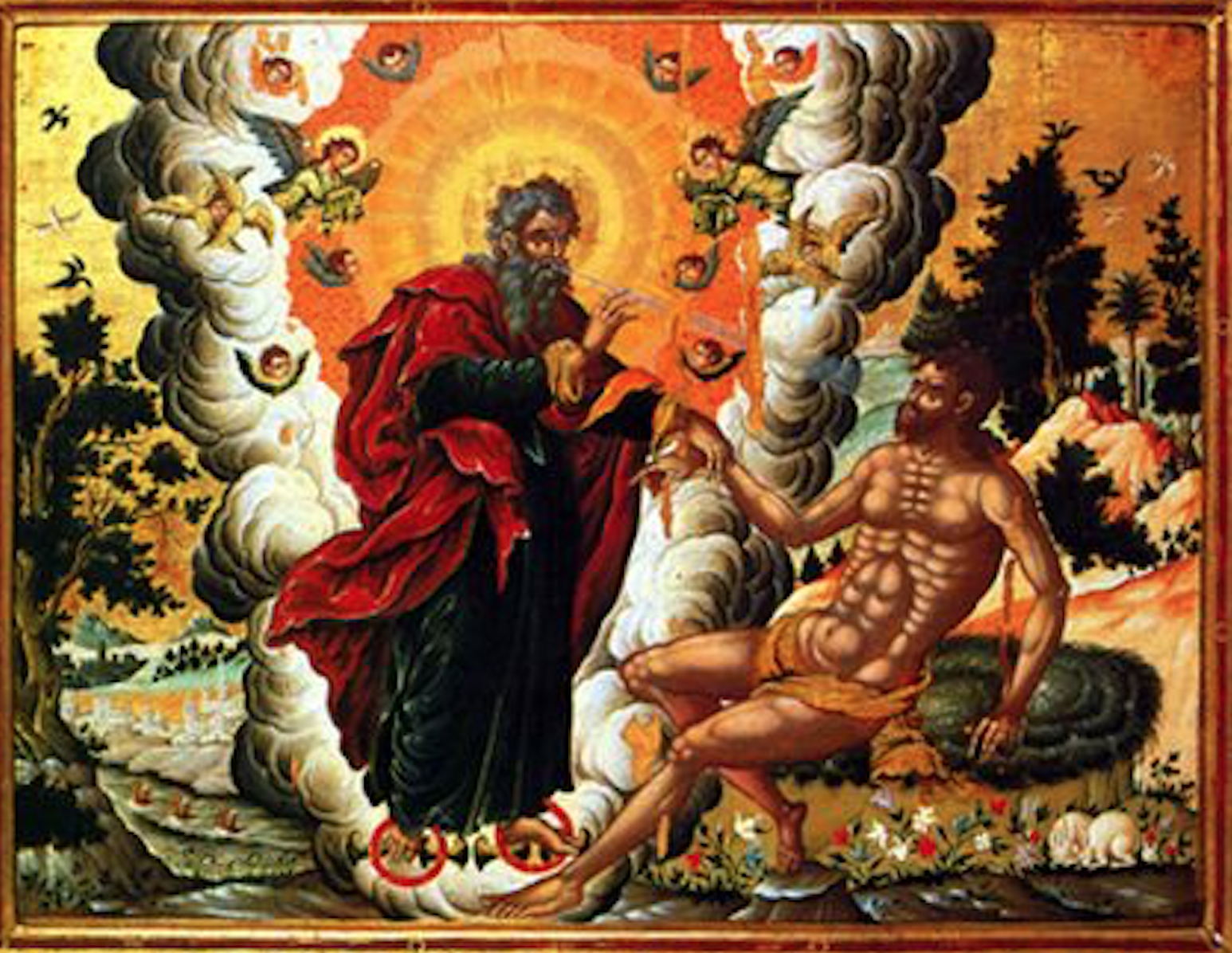
God Creates Adam

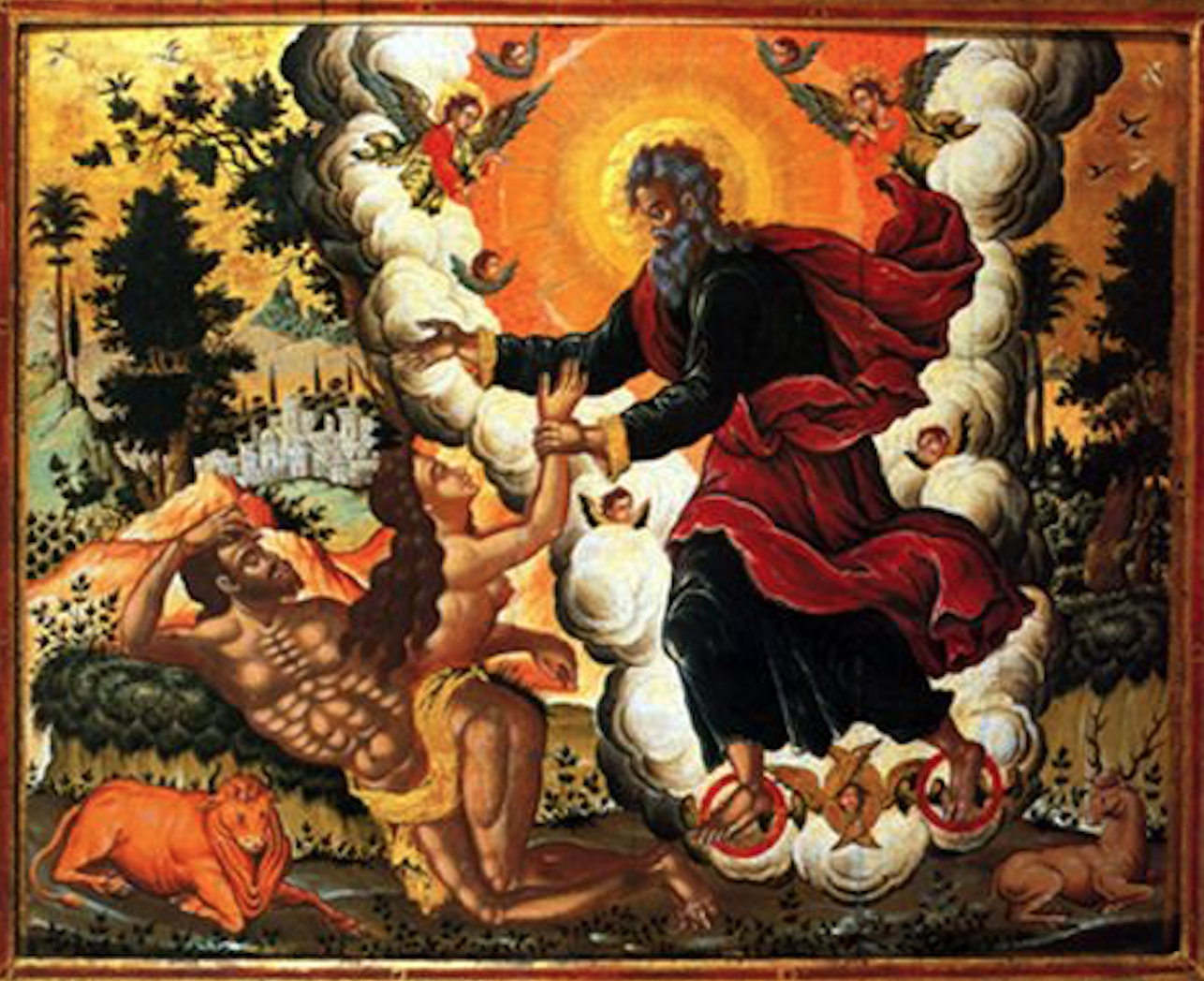
God Creates Eve

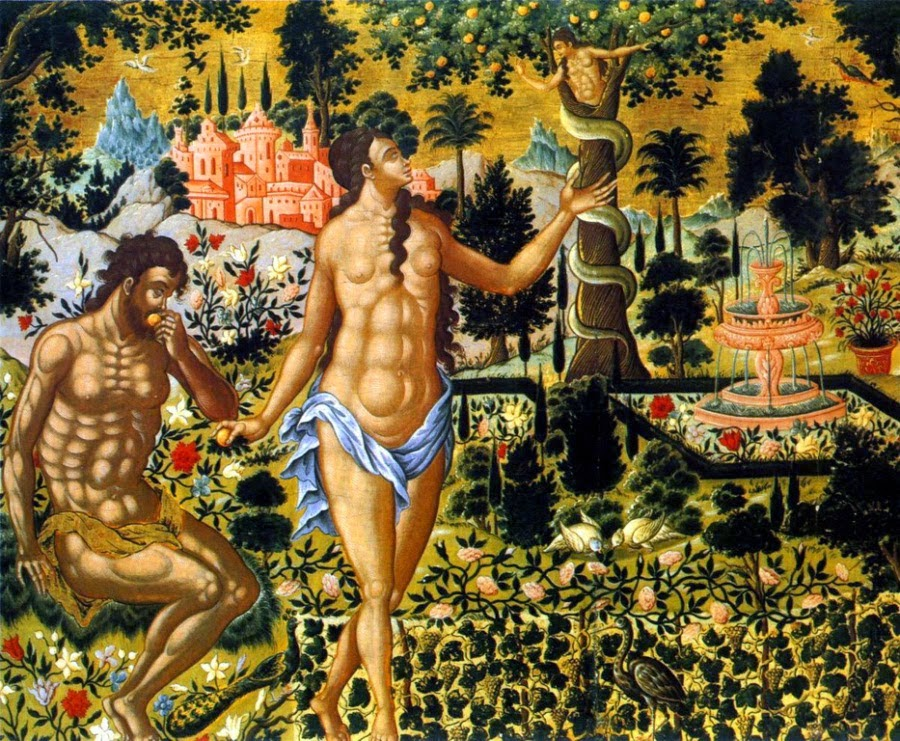
Adam and Eve

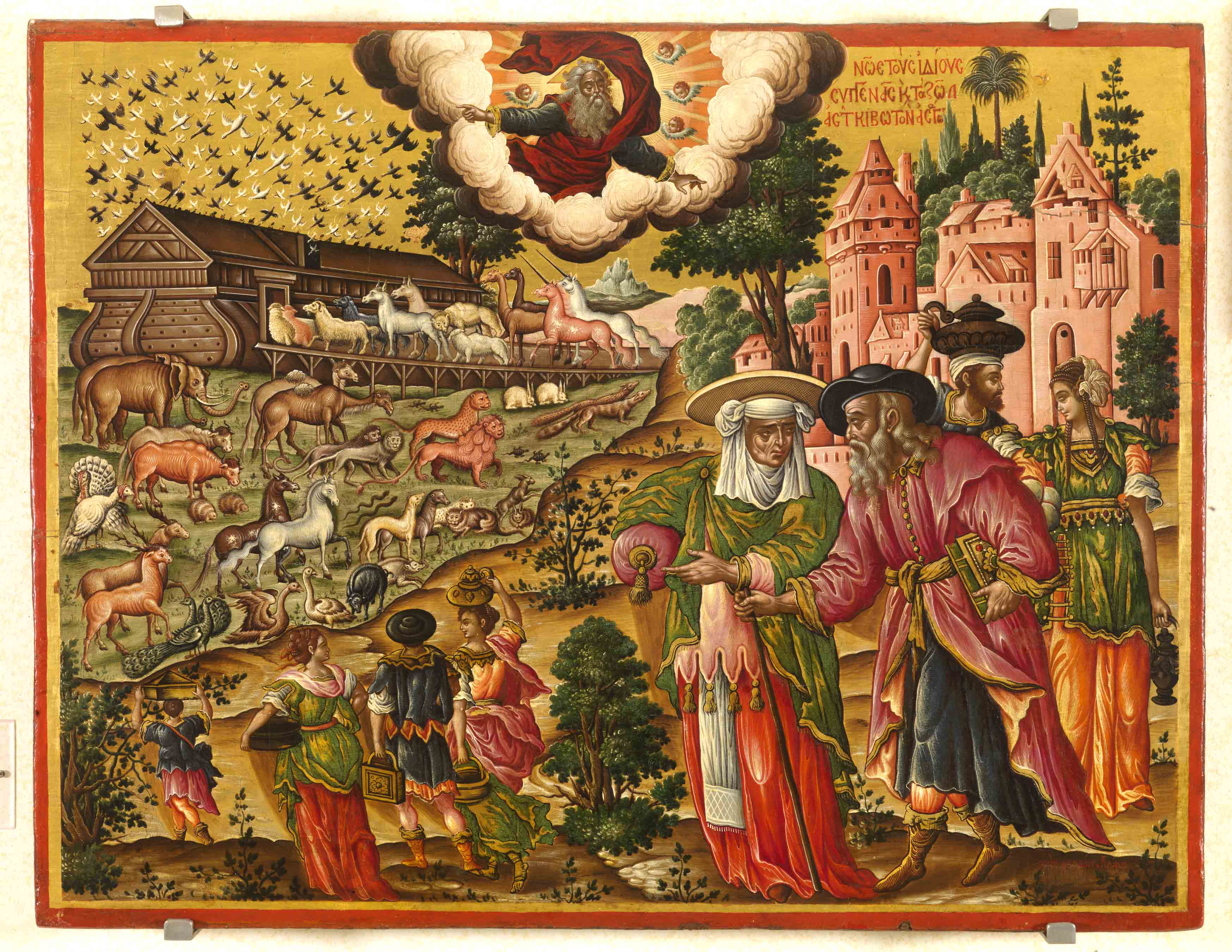
Noah's Ark

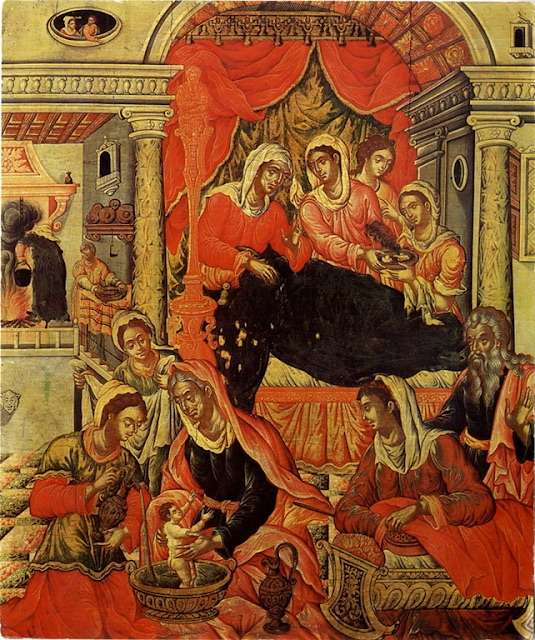
Birth of Isaac

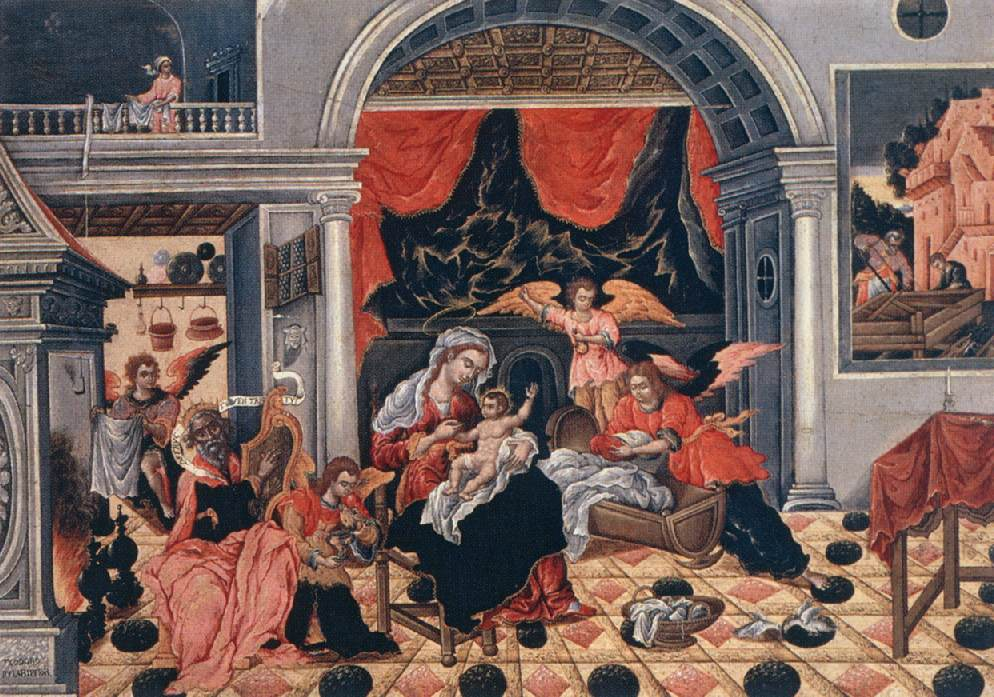
The Nativity of Christ

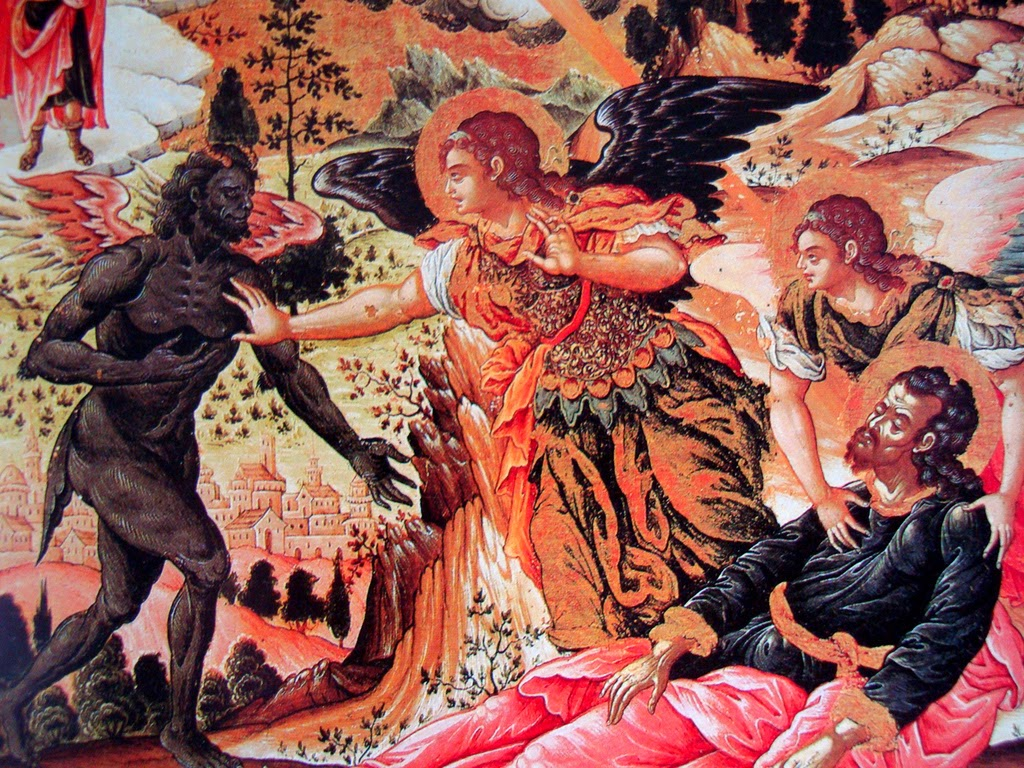
Death of Moses

== Notable works ==
- In Thee Rejoiceth (Poulakis)
- Adoration of Joseph, Collection Sterbini Rome, Italy
- The Four Knights of the Apocalypse Collection by S. Amberg Switzerland
- Onuphrius Entrhoned Livorno, Italy
- John the Baptist as Child Sotheby's London, United Kingdom
- John the Theologian Lefkosia, Cyprus
- Crucifixion, Collection of Abou-Adal Beirut, Lebanon
- All Thee Rejoices Private Collection Spain
- Noah's Ark (Poulakis)
- The Archangel Michael (Poulakis)
- The Fall of Man (Poulakis)
- The Miracle of the Holy Belt
- The Birth of the Virgin Mary (Poulakis)

== See also ==
- Greek scholars in the Renaissance
- Ioannis Apakas
- Konstantinos Kontarinis
- Ioannis Tzen

== Bibliography ==
- Hatzidakis, Manolis (1987). Greek painters after the fall (1450-1830) Volume A. Center for Modern Greek Studies E.I.E.
- Hatzidakis, Manolis & Drakopoulou, Eugenia (1997). Greek painters after the fall (1450-1830) Volume B. Center for Modern Greek Studies E.I.E.
- Drakopoulou, Eugenia (2010). Greek painters after the fall (1450-1830) Volume C. Center for Modern Greek Studies E.I.E.
