= In Thee Rejoiceth (Poulakis) =

Painting by Theodore Poulakis

All Creation Rejoices in Thee
- Επι Σοι Χαιρει (Greek), In Te Si Rallegra Tutta la Creazione (Italian)
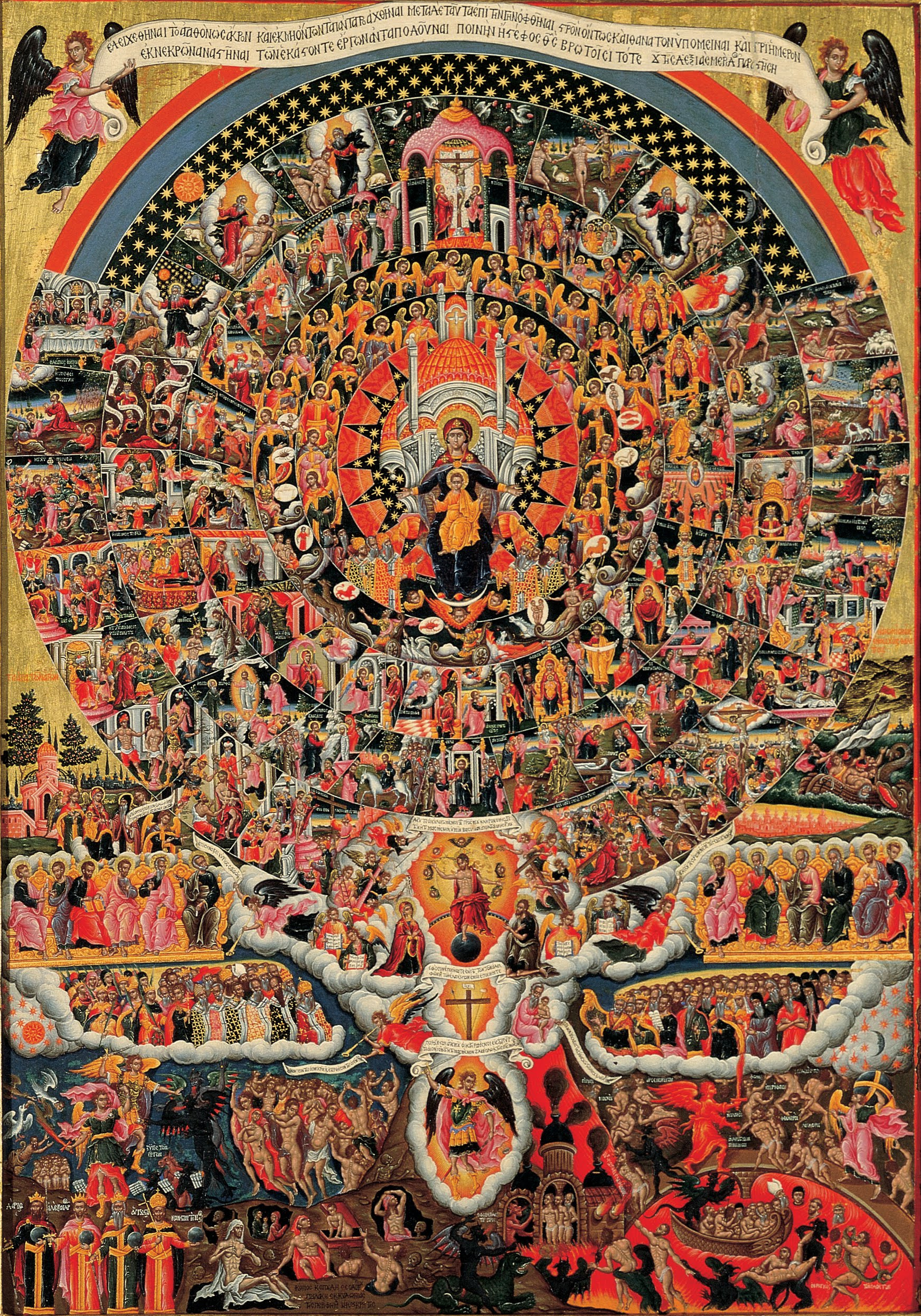
- Artist: Theodore Poulakis
- Year: c. 1640–1692
- Medium: tempera on wood
- Movement: Late Cretan school
- Subject: In Thee Rejoiceth
- Dimensions: 92 cm × 64 cm (36.2 in × 25.2 in)
- Location: Benaki Museum, Athens, Greece
- Owner: Benaki Museum
- Website: Official Website

In Thee Rejoiceth also known as Epi Si Harri is a tempera and gold leaf painting by Theodore Poulakis. The central figure of the piece is the Virgin Mary. The painting is a tribute to her. Poulakis was from Chania Crete. He was active on the Ionian islands and in Venice during the second half of the 17th century. He was a member of the Cretan school and the father of the Heptanese (Ionian) school. According to the Institute of Neohellenic Research, 130 paintings are attributed to Poulakis.

Poulakis version of In Thee Rejoiceth was inspired by an earlier work created by Klontzas. The painting is also called In Thee Rejoiceth. Another version of a similarly themed painting was created by Francheskos Kavertzas named In You Rejoices. Poulakis version of In Thee Rejoiceth is more closely similar to Klontzas. The Klontzas was created in the second half of the 16th century. The Poulakis painting is currently at the Benaki Museum in Athens, Greece.

== Hymn ==
Similar to Klontzas, the Poulakis painting was inspired by a hymn. The Syrian monk John of Damascus composed the hymn and it was used in the Divine Liturgy of Saint Basil the Great during the Liturgy of the Faithful. It continues to be used today. The hymn is as follows:

Ἐπὶ σοὶ χαίρει, Κεχαριτωμένη, πᾶσα ἡ
κτίσις, Ἀγγέλων τὸ σύστημα, καὶ ἀνθρώπων τὸ
γένος, ἡγιασμένε ναέ, καὶ Παράδεισε λογικέ,
παρθενικὸν καύχημα· ἐξ ἧς Θεὸς ἐσαρκώθη,
καὶ παιδίον γέγονεν, ὁ πρὸ αἰώνων ὑπάρχων
Θεὸς ἡμῶν. Τὴν γὰρ σὴν μήτραν, θρόνον
ἐποίησε, καὶ τὴν σὴν γαστέρα, πλατυτέραν
οὐρανῶν ἀπειργάσατο. Ἐπὶ σοὶ χαίρει,
Κεχαριτωμένη, πᾶσα ἡ κτίσις· δόξα σοι.

All of Creation rejoices in thee, O full of grace
the angels in heaven and the race of men,
O sanctified temple and spiritual paradise,
the glory of virgins, of whom God was incarnate
and became a child, our God before the ages.
He made thy body into a throne,
and thy womb more spacious than the heavens.
All of creation rejoices in thee, O full of grace
Glory be to thee.

== Description ==
The title of the painting is actually All Creation Rejoices in Thee. The common name is In Thee Rejoiceth. The work is the pictural representation of the Hymn to the Virgin. The image features a multitude of scenes. It was signed by Poulakis. The painting is egg tempera and gold leaf on wood. The dimensions are 92 cm (36.2 in) x 64 cm (25.2 in) it was completed in the middle part of the 17th century. It is within a gold frame. The painting follows the traditional maniera greca influenced by Venetian painting.

The Virgin is the central figure in the painting. In the upper portion, the geometric representation follows a circular arrangement featuring miniature scenes. The painter pictorially illustrates themes from the Old Testament. He also illustrates verses from the Akathistos Hymn and the Twelve Great Feasts. In the lower portion, the Last Judgement is part of the composition and in the left-hand corner, Alexander the Great is present with the rulers Darius, Augustus and Constantine the Great.

The top of the painting features a huge banner with a Greek inscription. The painting is full of hidden meanings and symbols. There are zodiac signs. At the top of the lower portion is an image of the typical representation of the Resurrection of Jesus. In the lower-left portion, a huge red angel bearing a sword is approaching sinners. The demons are painted in careful detail they pose a similarity to The Last Judgment painted by both Leos Moskos and Georgios Klontzas. Some parts of the work were also inspired by engravings created by the French engraver Étienne Delaune.

== Gallery ==
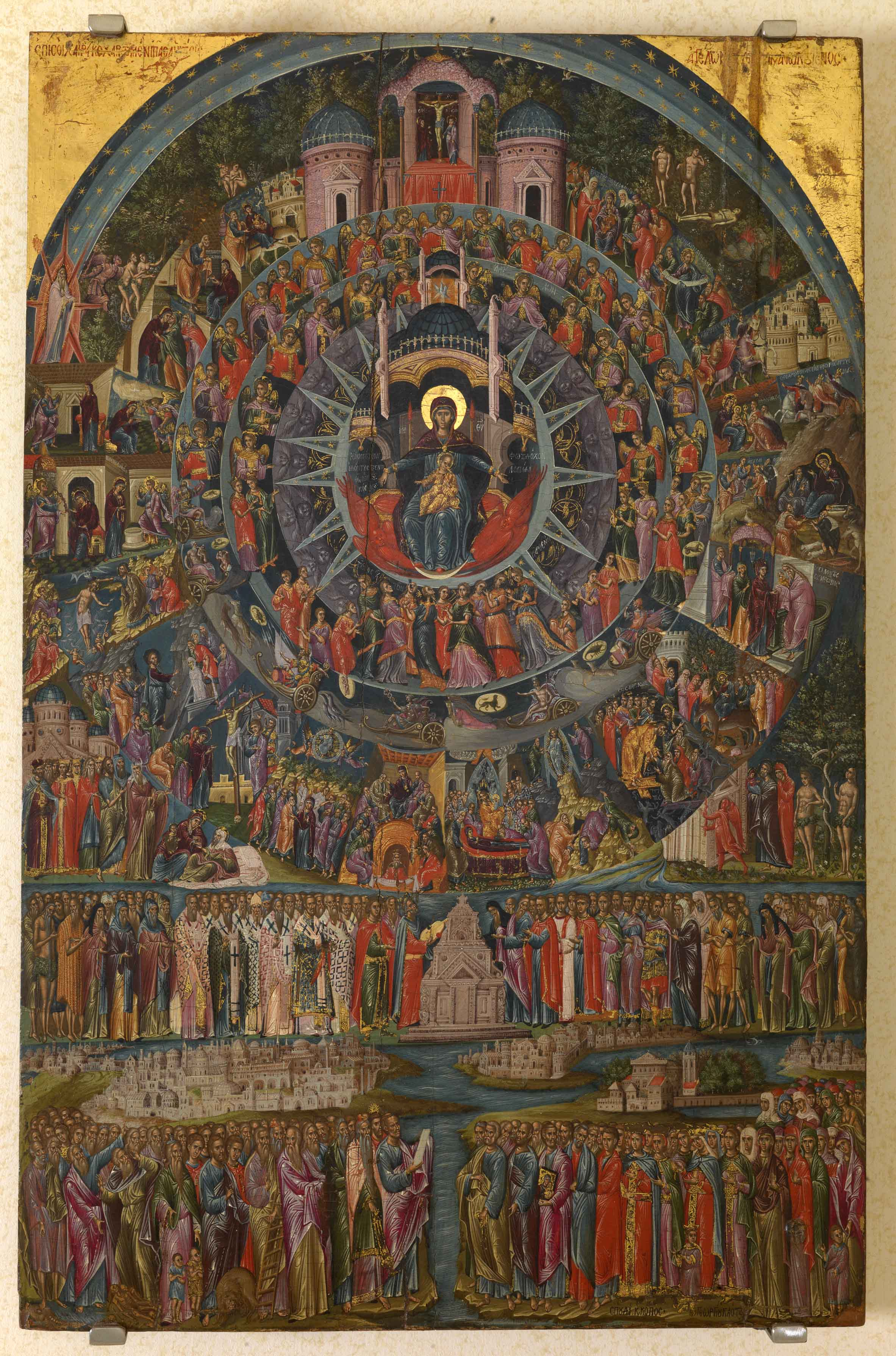
In Thee Rejoiceth

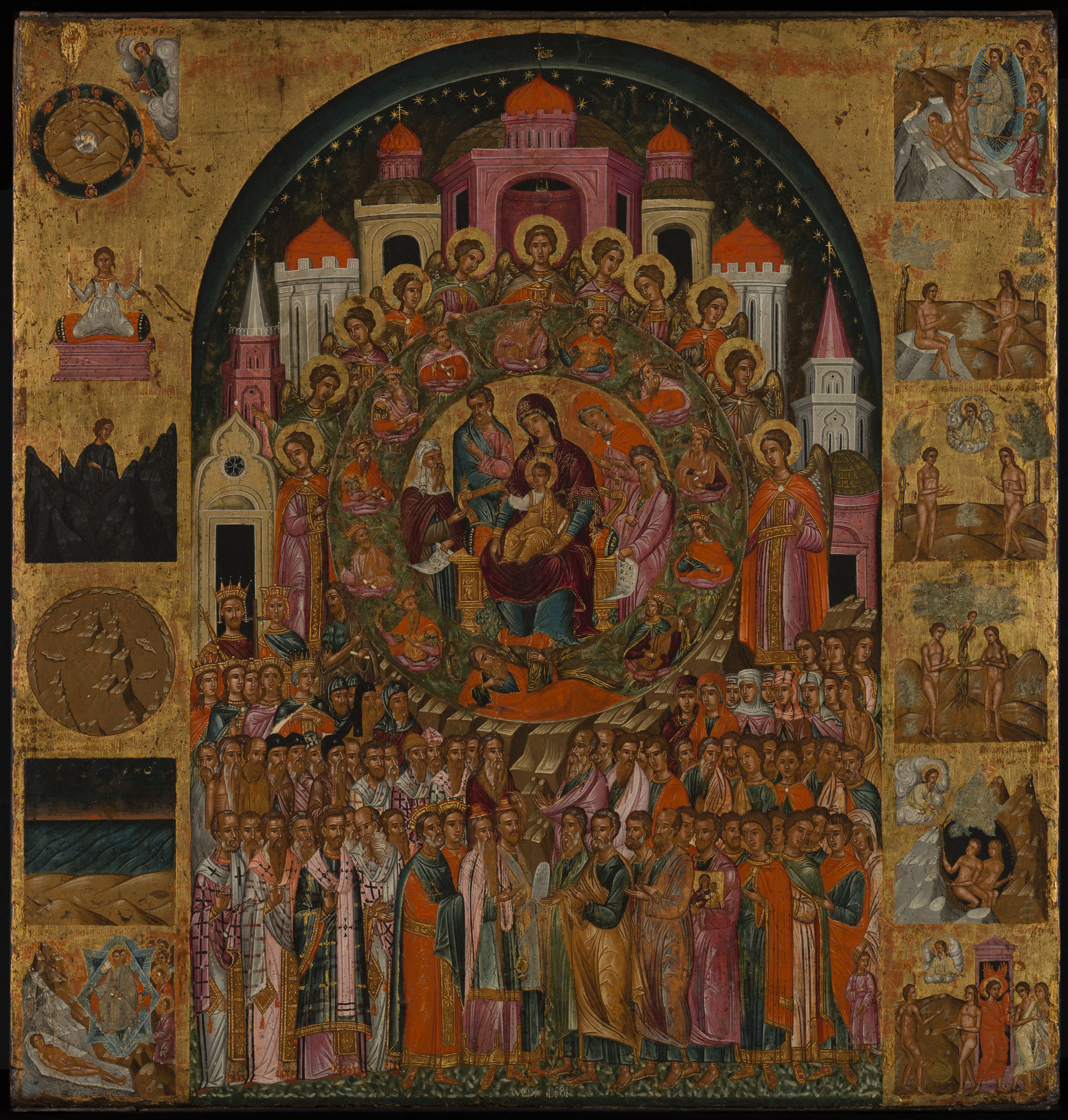
In You Rejoiceth

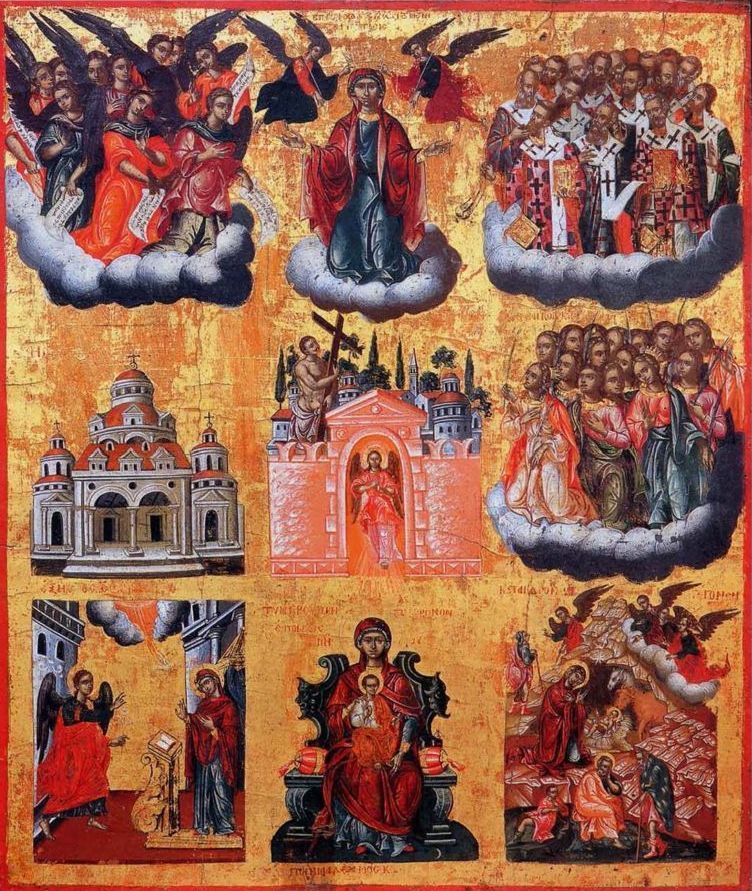
In Thee Rejoiceth (Moskos)
