= Painshill =

Park and landscape garden in England

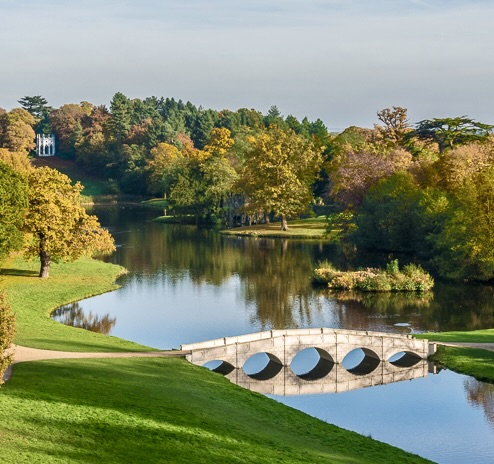
- The Gothic Temple (upper left), Five Arch Bridge (lower right) and lake

- Location within Surrey
- Location: Cobham, Surrey, England
- Coordinates: 51°19′44″N 0°25′46″W
- Created: 1738–1773
- Founder: Charles Hamilton
- Owner: Elmbridge Borough Council
- Collections: John Bartram Heritage Collection
- Website: www.painshill.co.uk

Site notes
- Area: 212 acres (86 hectares) (Note: The Grade I-listed Painshill Park, as defined by the Register of Historic Parks and Gardens of Special Historic Interest in England maintained by Historic England, covers an area of around 212 acres (86 hectares). Its principal boundaries are the A3 (to the north-west) and the River Mole (to the south and east). Although around 153 acres (62 ha) of the registered site is owned by Elmbridge Borough Council, the Grade I listing also covers land in private ownership, including Painshill House and the Heyswood campsite. Volume II of The History and Antiquities of the County of Surrey, originally published in 1809, asserts that the enclosed land at Painshill amounted to a total of "213 acres".)

National Register of Historic Parks and Gardens
- Official name: Painshill Park
- Type: Grade I
- Designated: 1 June 1984
- Reference no.: 1000125

Painshill (formally Painshill Park) is a restored, 18th-century English park and landscape garden in Cobham, Surrey, England. It was created between 1738 and 1773 by the owner, Charles Hamilton, from an area of heathland and woodland. Painshill is laid out as a series of scenes, crafted by combining architectural features with trees and shrubs, many of which are non-native species. Several of the surviving follies are listed in their own right, including the Gothic Tower, at the western end of the park, and the Gothic Temple, which overlooks the northern part of the lake. The Grotto, the largest in England, is decorated with crystalline mineral stones, including quartz, feldspar and Blue John.

In designing Painshill, Hamilton was influenced by 17th-century landscape artists, whose works he had encountered on Grand Tours in continental Europe. Instead of trying to replicate specific artworks, Hamilton used the techniques of landscape painting to create scenes with contrasting emotional tones – from the solemnity of the dark evergreens surrounding the Mausoleum, to the brighter trees and flowers at the Temple of Bacchus. Advocates of the Picturesque were complimentary of Hamilton's work, particularly the hillier, western half of the park, which Horace Walpole likened to a "kind of Alpine scene". International visitors to the park and garden included John Adams, the future American president, who wrote that "Paines Hill is the most striking piece of art that I have yet seen."

Hamilton borrowed heavily to finance his work and was forced to sell Painshill in 1773. The estate passed through a series of private owners until the Second World War, when it was requisitioned for military use. In the late 1940s, it was divided into lots and parts were used for commercial forestry and pig farming. The architectural features began to decay and much of the land became overgrown. Concerns over the condition of the park were voiced in the following decades, leading to the purchase of over 150 acres (61 hectares) by Elmbridge Borough Council in the late 1970s and early 1980s. In June 1984, around 212 acres (86 ha) of Hamilton's original estate was designated a Grade I Park and Garden on the register of historic parks and gardens maintained by Historic England.

Restoration of Painshill began in the early 1980s, with the aim of reinstating Hamilton's original design wherever possible. Surviving architectural features, including the Gothic Temple and Ruined Abbey, were restored, and those that had disappeared completely, such as the Turkish Tent and the Hermitage, were reconstructed. The part of the park owned by the borough council was reopened to the public on summer weekends from mid-May 1989 and seven-days-a-week from April 1997. In January 1999, the park was awarded a Europa Nostra medal for its "exemplary restoration", and in May 2006, the plantation of non-native trees on the Chinese Peninsula was awarded "national collection status" by the National Council for the Conservation of Plants and Gardens. Since 2000, Painshill has been used as a filming location for the feature films Dorian Gray and Suffragette and for the television series Black Mirror and Bridgerton.

== History ==
=== Early history ===
The earliest surviving record of Painshill is from 1548, when it appears as Payneshill in a Land Registry manuscript. The area may have been named after the Payne family, who owned part of the land in the late Middle Ages. A "Richard Payne" appears in the 1263 assizes documents and the name "John Payne" can be found in local subsidy rolls from 1332. In the 16th century, the area surrounding Painshill House was recorded as the "Painshill common field" and "The Paynes Hawe".

Painshill was originally part of the manor of Walton-on-Thames, but had become separate by 1512, when a portion of the land was conveyed to Richard Foxe, then Bishop of Winchester. Foxe transferred his holding to Corpus Christi College, Oxford, which he founded in 1517. In 1539, Henry VIII expanded the Chase of Hampton Court, incorporating "parte of the Towne or Village of Cobham in the Countie of Surrie". A survey of the chase from around 1540 identifies six areas within Painshill owned by the Crown, including the "Greate grove", of around 40 acres (16 hectares), and "hale hill", the future site of the Grotto.

Henry VIII died in 1547 and Painshill was subsequently divided into plots and leased. The two largest areas, the "Tenement at Payneshill" and the "Tenement at Coveham Bridge", became a single holding in 1570. Comprising around 97 1/2 acres (39 ha), the united tenement forms the core of the land at Painshill owned by Elmbridge Borough Council. A survey of March 1649 suggests that part of the area was being used as arable farmland, although there were still significant areas of woodland. There is also a record of a warren at Painshill in the 17th century.

At the start of the 18th century, Painshill was divided between land leased from the Crown by Robert Gavell and a freehold property owned by the Smyther family. Gabriel, Marquis du Quesne, bought the Smythers' land in around 1717, by which time it consisted of two or three farms. Du Quesne is thought to have built a house and laid out a small garden, but he was ruined as a result of the collapse of the South Sea Company in 1720 and he sold Painshill to William Bellamy in 1725. Bellamy, a barrister at the Inner Temple, also started to lease the land owned by the Crown, which had become available following the death of Gavell in 1724.

=== Creation of the park ===
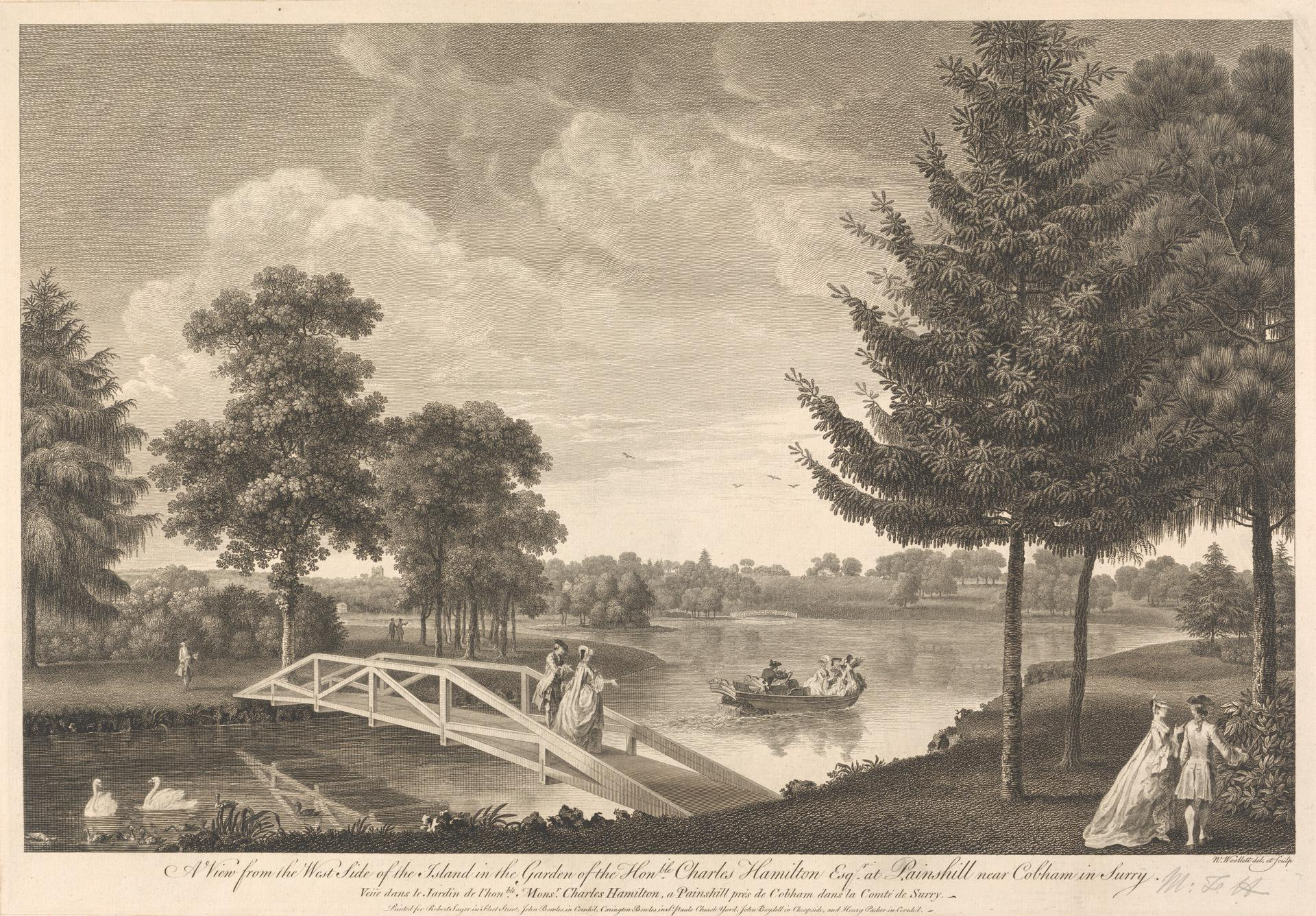
William Woollett, A View from the West Side of the Island in the Garden of the Hon. Charles Hamilton Esq. at Painshill near Cobham in Surrey. Engraving. Yale Center for British Art, New Haven.

Charles Hamilton was born in 1704 in Dublin, the 9th son and 14th child of James Hamilton, 6th Earl of Abercorn. In 1718, he became a pupil at Westminster School, where he was a contemporary of John Petty, 1st Earl of Shelburne, the future owner of Bowood House. He began studying at Oxford University in 1720, where he formed friendships with Henry Hoare, who would later create the gardens at Stourhead, Wiltshire, and the brothers Stephen Fox, the future 1st Earl of Ilchester, and Henry Fox, the future 1st Baron Holland. After gaining a BA in 1723, Hamilton set off on his first Grand Tour in 1725 and, while in Rome, collected numerous artworks and became familiar with the landscape paintings of Claude Lorrain, Nicolas Poussin and Salvator Rosa. He returned from Europe two years later and became the member of the Irish House of Commons for Strathbane. During his second visit to Rome in 1732, Hamilton was introduced to George Knapton, the artist and dealer, and his portrait was painted by Antonio David.

Hamilton began to acquire property at Painshill in 1737, purchasing William Bellamy's freehold and lease from the Crown, and adding additional land to create an estate of more than 200 acres (81 ha). (Note: It is possible that Charles Hamilton was familiar with the area around Painshill through his friendship with the Fox family, who owned the nearby Downe Place, known later as Cobham Park.) He moved to Painshill in 1738 and began to create the park shortly afterwards. A map by John Rocque, dated 1744, indicates that the first part of the lake had been dug out and formal areas of planting at the Amphitheatre and Keyhole had been created. (Note: Michael Symes suggests that although the map of Painshill by John Rocque is dated 1744, the survey work from which it was drawn may have taken place considerably earlier and that the garden depicted may therefore include elements introduced by the Marquis du Quesne and William Bellamy, the previous owners, which Charles Hamilton had altered or removed by the time of publication.) In the mid-1740s, Hamilton began planting exotics, non-native species of trees and shrubs, some of which were supplied as seeds by John Bartram, an American horticulturalist.

Elias Martin, Grotto at Painshill, near Cobham. Watercolour on paper. Nationalmuseum, Stockholm.

The earliest known folly to have been erected at Painshill was the Chinese Seat, described and sketched by Sophia Newdigate after a visit in August 1748. It is not mentioned in any subsequent first-hand account and Michael Symes, a garden historian, suggests that it was replaced by the Hermitage, first recorded in 1752. The majority of the other architectural features were constructed in the late 1750s and early 1760s, although work on the Grotto continued until around 1770. Towards the end of the 1760s, Hamilton constructed a brickworks in the southern part of the park in an attempt to develop an income stream from his land; the scheme was a financial failure and he constructed the Ruined Abbey in 1772 to conceal the remains of the works.

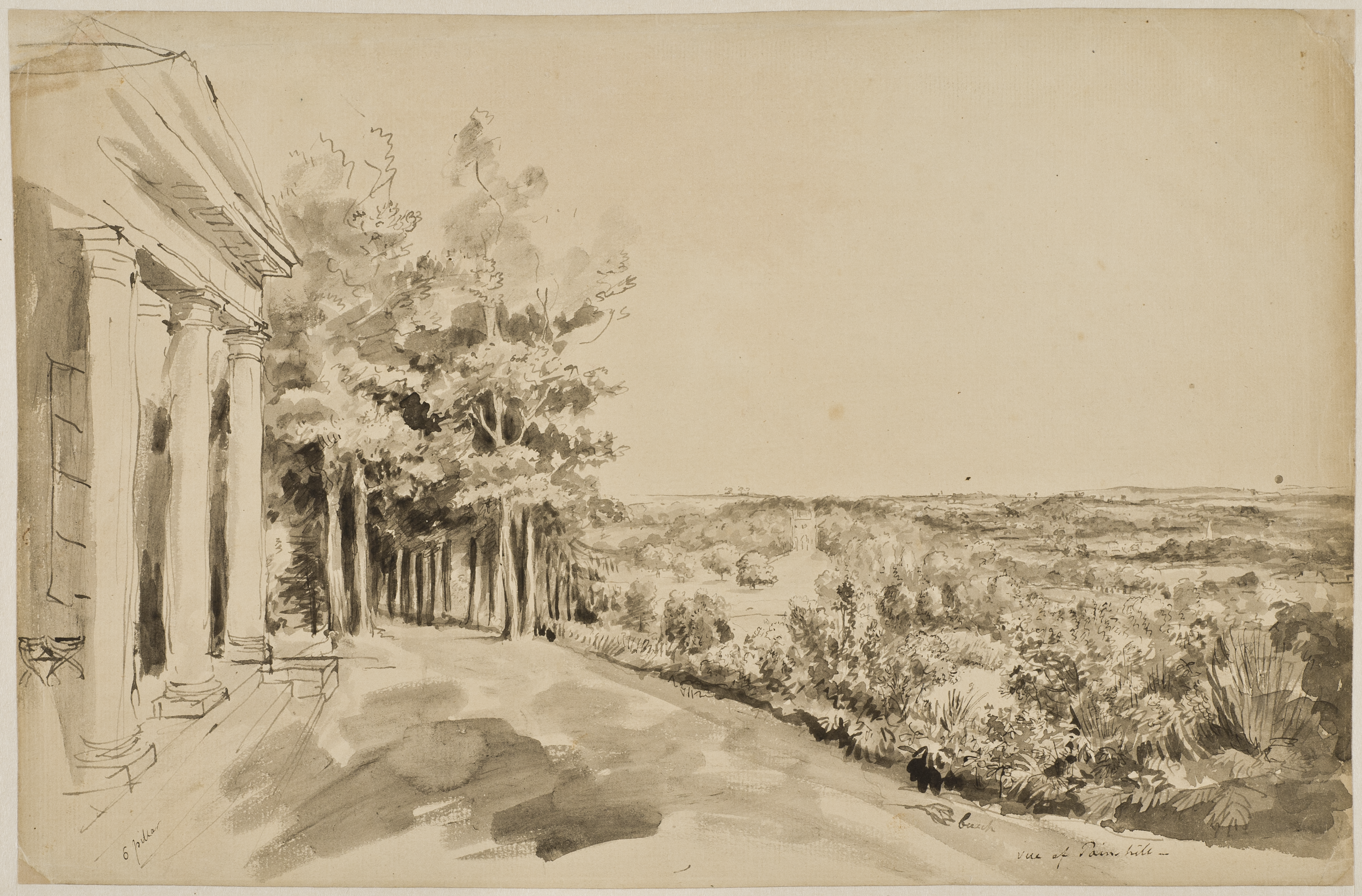
Elias Martin, View of the Temple of Bacchus and in the background the Gothick Temple in the park at Painshill. 1770. Drawing. Nationalmuseum, Stockholm.

Although a relatively private person, Hamilton nevertheless entertained small parties of guests in the garden. On those occasions, refreshments were probably served in some of the follies, especially the Temple of Bacchus. Painshill was also open to respectable visitors, not specifically invited by Hamilton, who were generally shown round by the head gardener for a tip after giving their names. Among those to write about their experiences were William Gilpin, a leading advocate of the Picturesque, who considered Painshill "one of the most beautiful things of the kind I have seen", and Thomas Whately, the landscape garden author, who wrote that "a boldness of design, and a happiness of execution, attend the wonderful efforts which art has there made to rival nature." Thomas Jefferson and John Adams, future American presidents, toured the garden in 1786, and Adams wrote in his diary that "Paines Hill is the most striking piece of art that I have yet seen." Other international visitors included Prince Franz of Anhalt-Dessau and Count Ferenc Széchényi, a Hungarian statesman and founder of the National Museum of Budapest. Views from Painshill were painted on some pieces of the Frog Service commissioned by Catherine the Great of Russia from Wedgwood. In the early 19th century, Jane Austen and John Claudius Loudon visited the garden.

Although Hamilton had received an income while working as Clerk Comptroller to Frederick, Prince of Wales, between 1738 and 1747, he also borrowed money from Henry Hoare and Henry Fox to finance the work at Painshill. The repayment of these loans became due in 1773 and Hamilton was forced to sell the estate to Benjamin Bond Hopkins. (Note: After selling Painshill in 1773, Charles Hamilton moved to Bath, Somerset. He died there on 11 September 1786 and was buried in Bath Abbey.) In around 1778, Bond Hopkins commissioned Richard Jupp to build a new mansion to the south of Hamilton's residence, which became the site of the stables. Bond Hopkins continued to invest in the park, constructing the Bath House and a boat house, as well as planting new trees. (Note: The Bath House at Painshill was constructed by Benjamin Bond Hopkins in around 1790. Built on the site of a spring close to the Great Cedar, it was a circular building with an attached changing cubicle. The thatched roof had a circular oculus and the bath itself was around 14 ft (4.3 m) in diameter and 5 ft (1.5 m) deep. The Bath House was dismantled after the Second World War and the bricks were reused to construct a piggery.) He died in 1794 and, three years later, the trustees of his estate sold Painshill to Robert Hibbert, a merchant.

=== 19th and early 20th centuries ===
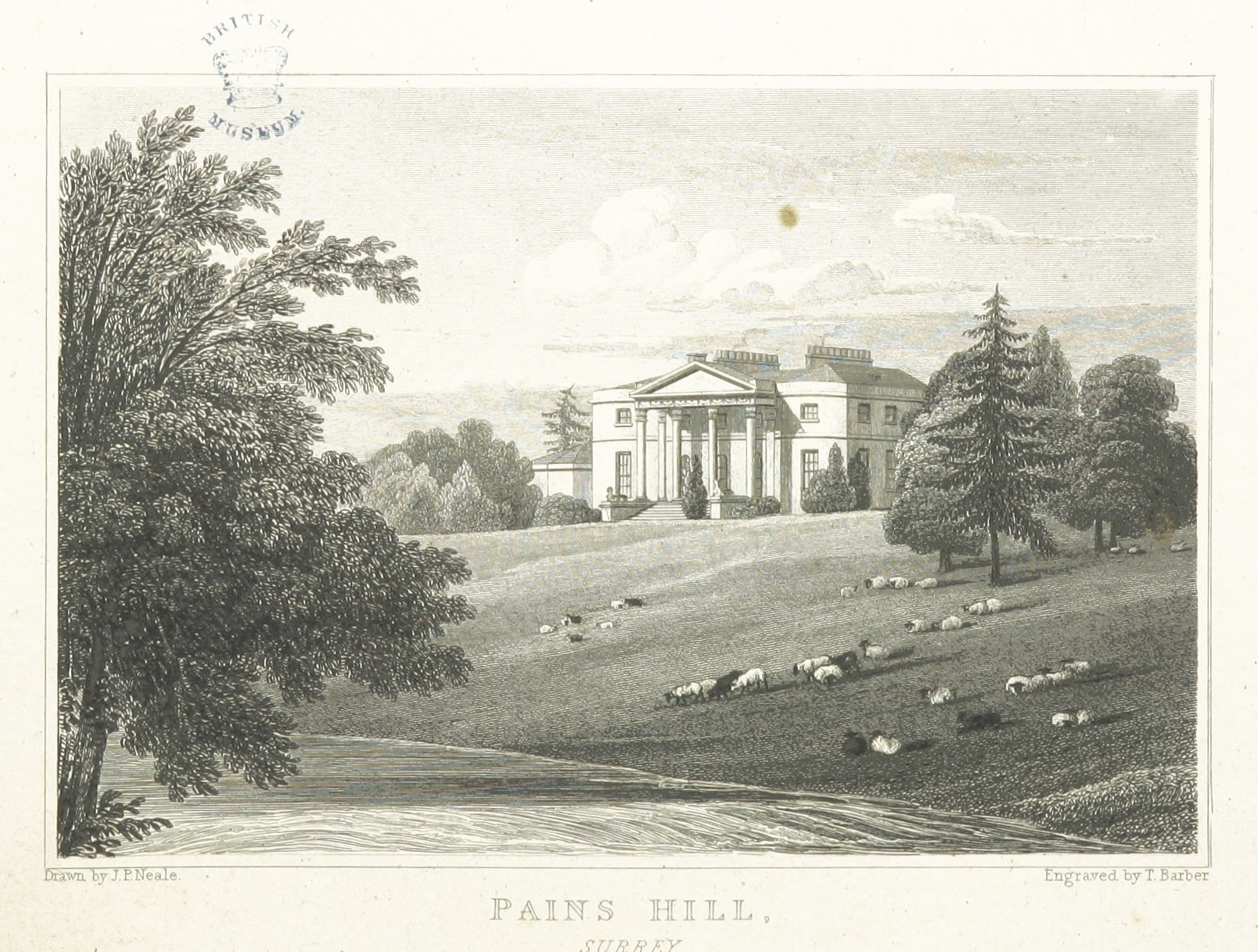
John Preston Neale, Pains Hill Surrey. 1824. Engraving. British Library, London.

Following Hamilton's departure in 1773, the subsequent owners had continued to allow visits to the park by members of the public. However, this access was withdrawn by William Moffat, who purchased Painshill from Robert Hibbert in around 1801. Moffat sold the estate in 1805 to Henry Luttrell, 2nd Earl of Carhampton, who moved to the property from Cobham Park. Luttrell was responsible for planting additional trees in several areas, including the Vineyard, the Amphitheatre and along the boundaries of the estate. He also planted an oak tree near the Grotto to commemorate the Battle of Waterloo and commissioned the construction of the Ice House. He died in 1821, but his widow continued to live at Painshill until her death in 1831, when it was sold to William Cooper.

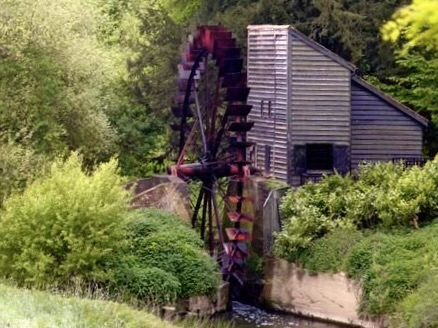
The Waterwheel after restoration, originally installed by William Cooper

Cooper commissioned Decimus Burton to make alterations to Painshill House, reconfiguring the interior, so that the east-facing portico became the main entrance. Cooper also installed the Grade II-listed Waterwheel, manufactured by Bramah, to raise water from the River Mole to the lake. Cooper died in 1840, but his widow, Harriet, continued to live at Painshill until her death in 1863. The next owner was Charles Leaf, who bought the property nine years later and commissioned Norman Shaw to make further alterations to Painshill House. Leaf, who sold the estate to Alexander Cushney in 1887, was responsible for renting Painshill Cottage to Matthew Arnold from 1873. Arnold, a poet and cultural critic, lived in the cottage until his death in 1888.

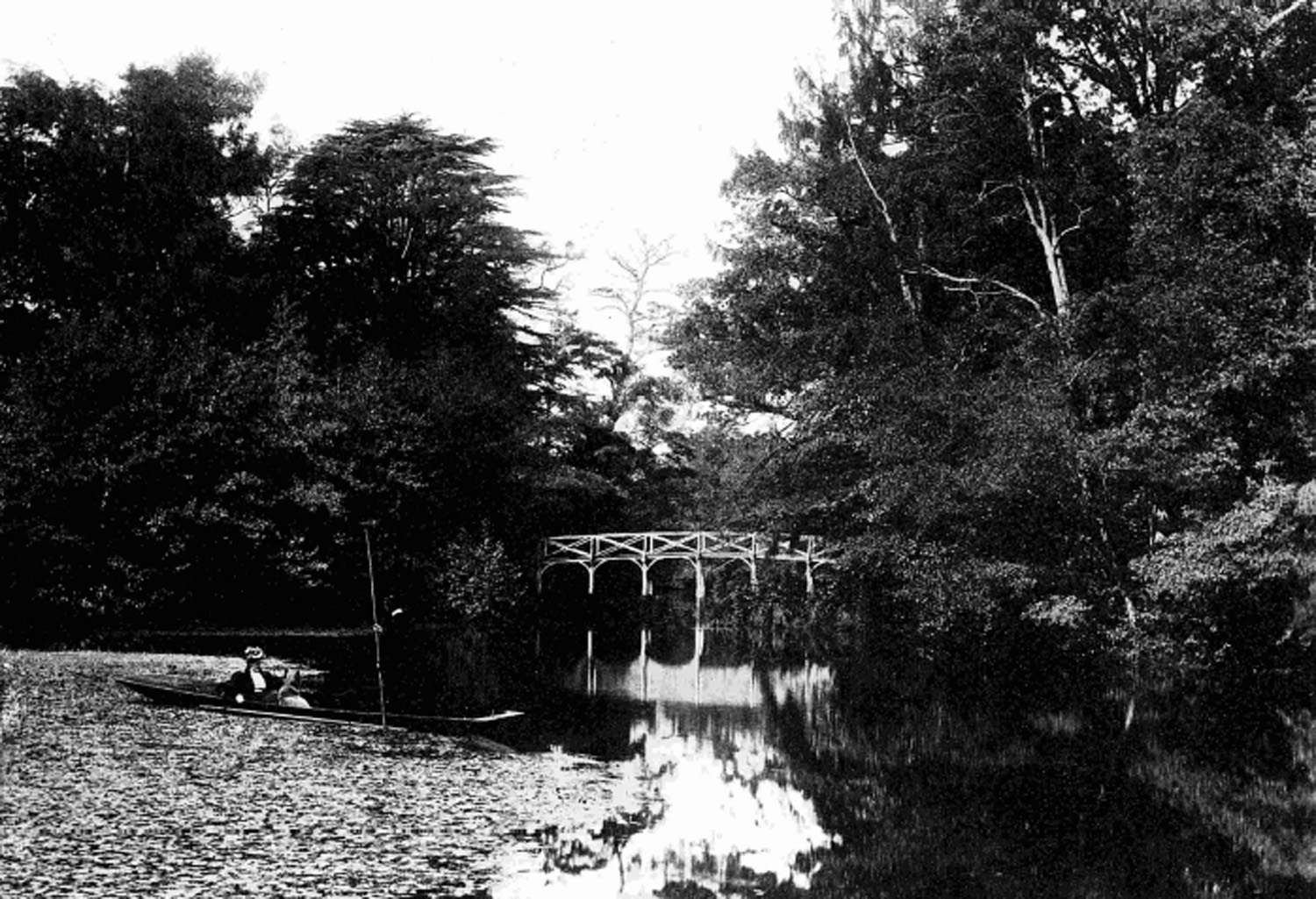
The Chinese Bridge, published in Country Life in 1897

Alexander Cushney died in 1903, but his widow, Alice, remained at Painshill and married Charles Combe, who owned Cobham Court. The Combes were responsible for starting a commercial timber plantation on the estate. Charles Combe died in 1920, but Alice Combe continued to live at Painshill until the start of the Second World War, when the park was requisitioned for the Canadian Army.

By the late 1940s, many of the architectural features were in an advanced state of decay, and the garden was becoming overgrown. Osvald Sirén, a Swedish art historian, observed on a visit to Painshill in 1947 that the Grotto roof had fallen in and that the interior was "filled with rubbish". (Note: Osvald Sirén visited Painshill twice, in 1946 and 1947. He had noted on his first visit that the Grotto was "still relatively well preserved".) Of the Mausoleum little more than the foundations remained, the Temple of Bacchus was in danger of collapse, and the Turkish Tent and the Hermitage "had disappeared". The Waterwheel was still able to supply the lake with water, although the Cascade was no longer visible. In Sirén's opinion, the Gothic Tower was the "best preserved of the architectural monuments", and he suggests that it might already have been subject to restoration work by the late 1940s".

In 1948, 236 acres (96 ha) of Painshill were purchased from the trustees of the Combe estate by the Baroness de Veauce, who divided the land into lots and sold it to separate purchasers. Commercial forestry continued and part of the park was used as a pig farm. In 1973, the Girl Guides Association opened the Heyswood campsite on land that had originally formed part of the park, and in the mid-1970s, a fire gutted the interior of the Gothic Tower, destroying the roof and staircase. (Note: Sources disagree as to whether the fire that severely damaged the Gothic Tower occurred in 1973 or 1974.)

=== Restoration ===
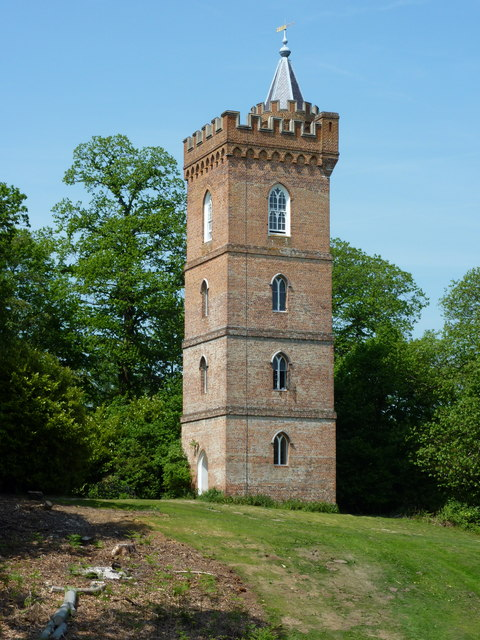
The Gothic Tower in 2010 after restoration

In the 1960s, concern about the state of the gardens at Painshill began to grow. A successful campaign was launched in the early 1970s to persuade the Historic Buildings Council for England to list the remaining buildings. Elmbridge Borough Council purchased 47 acres (19 ha) in 1975 and secured a further 106 acres (43 ha) in 1981. In acquiring the land, the council hoped to restore Painshill "as nearly as possible to Charles Hamilton's original design... for the benefit of the public and with the aim of making the Park a self-supporting enterprise." (Note: Elmbridge Borough Council acquired the majority of its land at Painshill in two purchases: The council bought 47 acres (19 ha) in 1975; a further 106 acres (43 ha) was bought for £135,000 in 1981 (£1.00 million in 2025). By September 1986, Elmbridge Borough Council owned around three-fifths of Charles Hamilton's original estate. Michael Symes states that the total amount paid by the borough council to acquire land at Painshill was £195,000, of which £25,000 was paid by Surrey County Council and £45,000 was paid by the Countryside Commission.)

Painshill Park Trust was formed in 1981 to restore the park and gardens, and was granted a 99-year lease on the land that the borough council had acquired. Detailed botanical and archaeological surveys, as well as archive research, were undertaken to fully understand the layout of Hamilton's park and its subsequent development. The information gathered was used to prepare a restoration masterplan, published in early 1984. The intention of the trust was to have undertaken all major capital works by 1994 and for the restoration programme to have concluded within 15 years. The first project, the restoration of the Gothic Temple and the surrounding land, was completed in 1985. Much of the early work was undertaken by participants in a Manpower Services Commission scheme, students from Merrist Wood Agricultural College and volunteers, including a group from the British Trust for Conservation Volunteers. In June 1984, around 212 acres (86 ha) of Hamilton's original estate was designated a Grade I Park and Garden on the register of historic parks and gardens maintained by Historic England.

Although an education programme for schoolchildren had been launched at Painshill in 1983, the park was not opened to the public until mid-May 1989. Visiting hours were restricted to weekends during the summer months, and the lack of a car park prevented full-time opening. A planning application for parking facilities was submitted in 1984, but local opposition delayed approval until April 1993, when an inspector from the Department of the Environment overruled the objectors. National Lottery funding of £848,000 was secured in mid-1996 to construct the car park and visitor facilities, and Painshill was opened seven-days-a-week from April 1997. In early 1999, Painshill was awarded a Europa Nostra medal for the "exemplary restoration from a state of extreme neglect, of a most important 18th-century landscape park and its extraordinary garden buildings." Around 200,000 people visited Painshill annually by 2022.

=== Botanical history ===
When Charles Hamilton purchased Painshill in 1737, much of the area was heathland with some areas of woodland. The park was created on two natural terraces to the north of the River Mole, where the acidic soil is primarily sandy with some clay, peat and silt. (Note: Horace Walpole described Painshill in its unimproved state as a "most cursed hill", and John Adams wrote that the soil was "a heap of Sand".) Hamilton began by trying to increase the fertility of the land, growing turnips on which sheep could graze. In a letter written in the 1760s, he describes how lawns were prepared by ploughing four or five times, before each acre (0.4 ha) was sowed with "six English bushels [around 8 imperial gallons, 36 litres] of the cleanest hayseed I could get and ten pounds [4.5 kg] of fresh Dutch clover seed". (Note: Robin Lane Fox, an academic and writer, suggests that Charles Hamilton's techniques for improving the soil fertility and preparing the ground at Painshill for planting would be now considered "organic methods".)

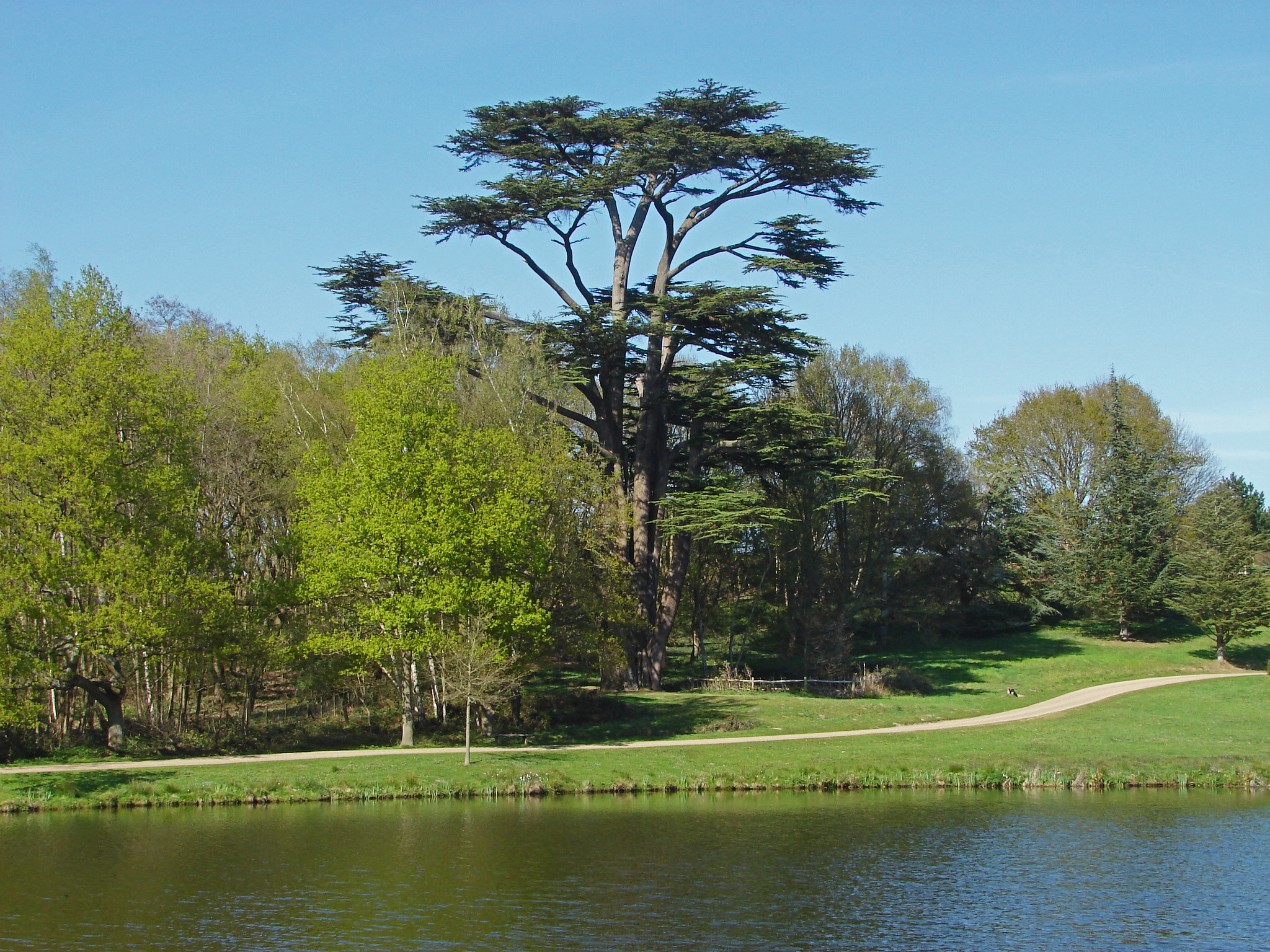
The Great Cedar

Fredrik Magnus Piper, Groups of cypress and cedar trees at Painshill. c. 1780. Drawing. Nationalmuseum, Stockholm.

Initially Hamilton was restricted to planting native trees, such as oak, elm, lime, beech, ash and chestnut, as well as naturalised pines and cedars. The Great Cedar, which he planted next to the lake, was around 130 ft tall (40 m) and 10 ft (3 m) in diameter in 2010, and is reputed to be the largest multi-stemmed cedar in Europe. In the mid-1740s, he began planting "exotics", non-native species of trees and shrubs, and he received two consignments of seeds from John Bartram, a horticulturalist in Philadelphia, in 1748 and 1756. North American species that Hamilton planted include white oaks, tulip trees and Nyssa species, which provided a vivid display of autumn colour. Hamilton also received plants from the Abbé Nolin, an adviser to Louis XV in Paris, who was able to source species from the French colonial empire. The variety of trees was admired by Karl von Zinzendorf, a Saxon-Austrian civil servant who, after visiting Painshill in 1768, wrote that the park was "premièrement par le choix des arbres". Horace Walpole also praised Hamilton's planting scheme, noting that the exotics, "contributed to the richness of colouring so peculiar to our modern landscape".

Hamilton planted shrubs in several parts of the park. They were used to screen unwanted views and to force paths to take circuitous routes, giving visitors the illusion of greater distance as they moved between different areas. They also provided an appropriate setting for the follies, with darker evergreens creating a solemn backdrop to the Mausoleum, while more decorative species were found around the Temple of Bacchus, which John Parnell described as being "dressed and clumped with sweet trees and flowers". Loudon wrote in 1838 that whitethorn hedging was used to separate Painshill House from the park, and he also noted that Hamilton had planted some of the first azalea and Rhododendron species to be imported to England.

Bond Hopkins, who purchased Painshill in 1773, continued to plant new trees and also removed those that Hamilton had planted but that had not grown well. Luttrell, who owned the park between 1805 and his death in 1821, introduced more native species, overplanting the Vineyard with Scots pine and creating large areas of oak, sweet chestnut and beech. The Coopers, who acquired Painshill in 1832, introduced several new exotics, including Wellingtonias, Monterey pines and deodar cedars. In the early 20th century, Charles and Alice Combe planted additional exotics, but also introduced commercial forestry species, creating plantations of larch, Norway spruce and Douglas fir.

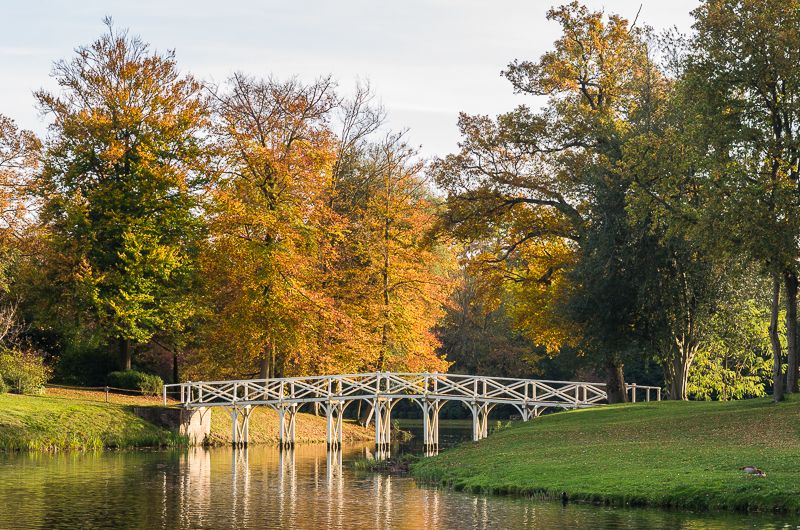
Autumn foliage on the Chinese Peninsula behind the Chinese Bridge

Detailed botanical research was undertaken at the start of the 1980s, after Painshill had been acquired by Elmbridge Borough Council. A historic tree survey took place in 1981–1982, during which the positions and ages of around 8000 plants were recorded. Around 170 trees were identified that had been planted by Hamilton. Restoration began with the clearance of 20th-century plantations, as well as areas of scrub where species such as alder had self-seeded. Several large trees were lost during the great storm of 1987, including a 200-year-old oak, which was felled by the high winds. Arboreal restoration was focused on reintroducing species that Hamilton had used at Painshill, with two cedars imported from Pisa, Italy, and other plants provided by the Royal Horticultural Society from its nearby garden at Wisley. In May 2006, the John Bartram Heritage Collection of exotics on the Chinese Peninsula was awarded "national collection status" by the National Council for the Conservation of Plants and Gardens.

== Overview ==
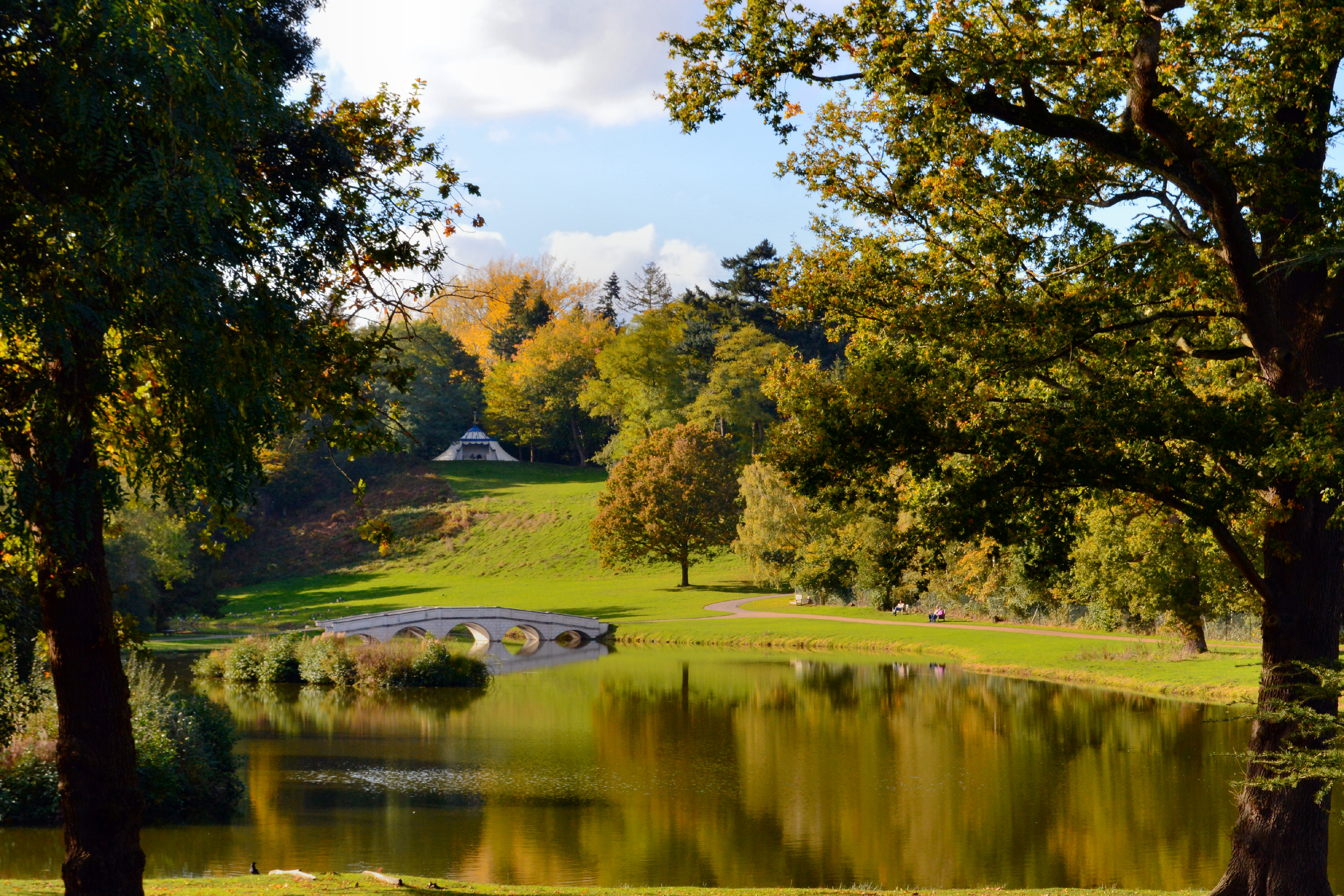
The Turkish Tent and Five Arch Bridge from Grotto Island

Painshill (formally called Painshill Park) is a Grade I-listed park and landscape garden, around 1 mile (1.6 km) west of the centre of Cobham, Surrey. It is laid out as a 4-mile (6.4 km) circuit, which 18th-century visitors typical followed in a clockwise direction. It was created as a combined park and garden: The garden, centred on the northern shore of the lake, was highly cultivated and was described by some contemporary writers as the "pleasure ground"; the park lay to the west and to the north, and contained areas of woodland, although parts were also grazed by sheep. The two areas were complementary, as Thomas Whately wrote in 1770: "park and gardens at Painshill... mutually contribute to the beauty of several landskips [landscapes]..." An unusual feature is that Painshill House, which is not in public ownership, is not at the centre of the park and garden, and its location provided a degree of privacy for the owners of the estate.

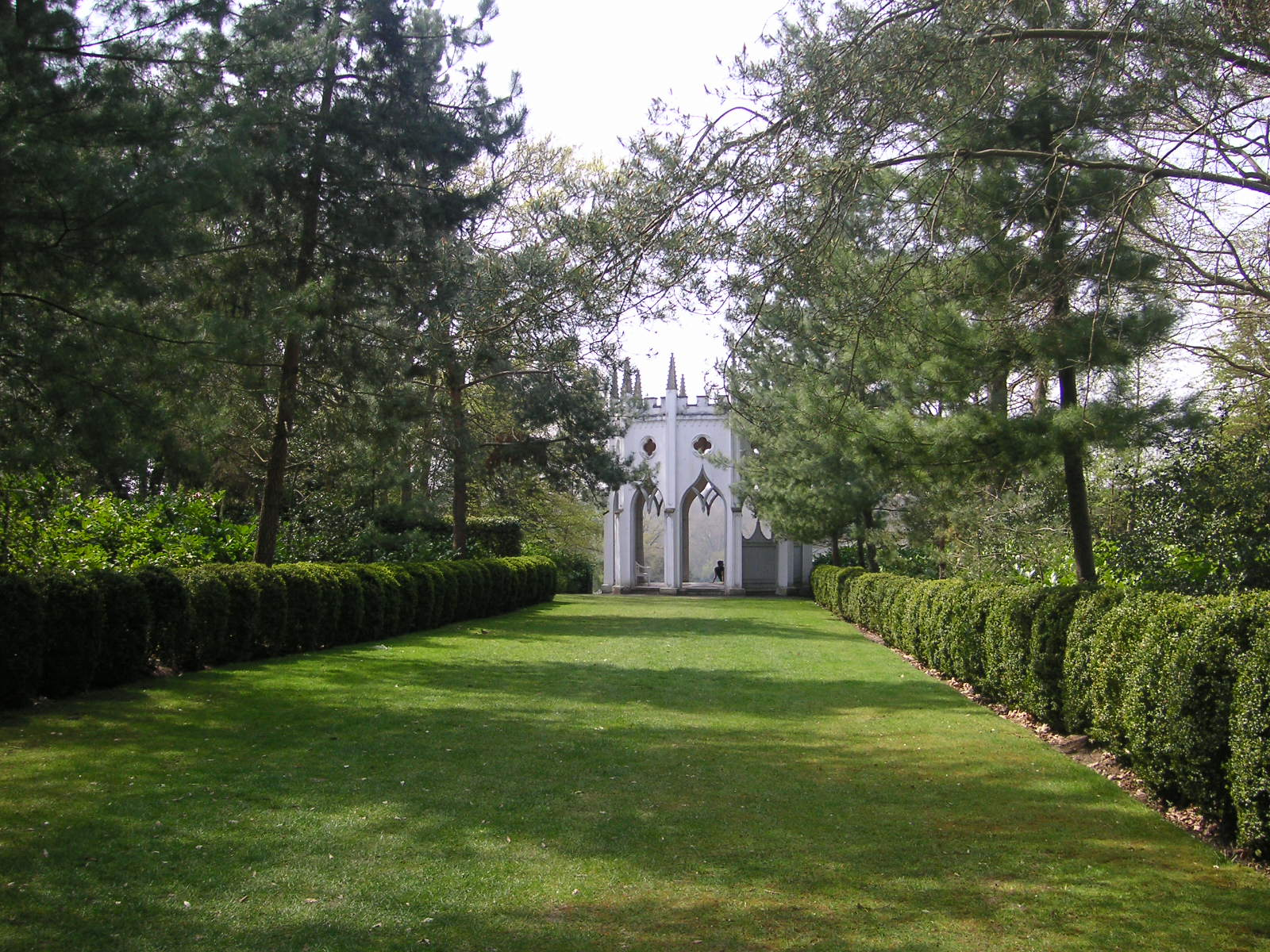
The eastern approach to the Gothic Temple is lined with evergreen hedges and pine trees

Unlike contemporary gardens at Stourhead and Stowe, Charles Hamilton did not intend Painshill to have a single unifying theme or narrative. Instead, as Stephanie Ross writes, Hamilton's garden offered "a series of engaging visual scenes with contrasting emotional tones and carefully composed visual surprises, but did not have a complex meaning that visitors were to puzzle out." The use of illusion is a key aspect of the design, and the planting was arranged to subtly restrict views across the park, producing a distorted perspective to give the impression of greater distance and scale. Ross cites the open-sided Gothic Temple as an example of a "managed surprise", from which the vista across the lake to the Five Arch Bridge and Turkish Tent opens up. She also notes that Painshill, like many 18th-century landscape gardens, cannot be seen in full from a single viewpoint and as a result "the visitor lacks a 'mental map' or sense of the whole."

== Features ==
Structures and areas of planting at Painshill (not all features shown): Vineyard (1); Amphitheatre (2); Gothic Temple (3); Ruined Abbey (4); Chinese Bridge (5); Grotto (6); Woollett Bridge (7); Mausoleum (8); Five Arch Bridge (9); Cascade (10); Waterwheel (11); Hermitage (12); Gothic Tower (13); Temple of Bacchus (14); reconstructed Turkish Tent (15); Keyhole (16); Walled Gardens (17); Painshill House , built c. 1778 (18); site of Charles Hamilton's house (19); car park (20); Heyswood campsite Activity Centre (21); boundary of the Grade I-listed land owned by Elmbridge Borough Council (red line)

=== Lake ===
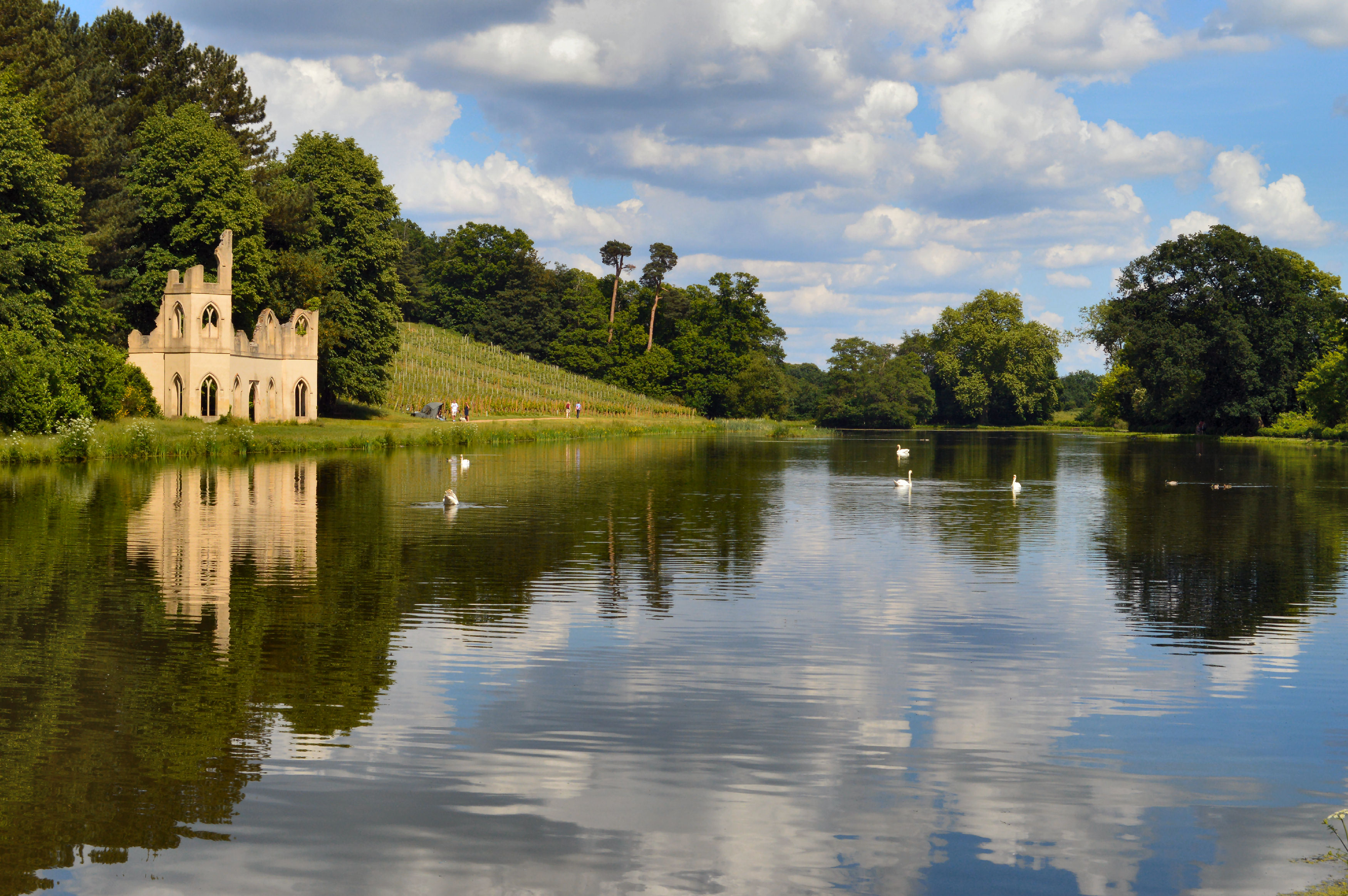
The Ruined Abbey (far left), the Vineyard (centre left) and the lake

The 17-acre (6.9 ha) lake is at the centre of the garden and forms the setting for several of the follies, including the Gothic Temple and Grotto. It was developed in several stages from an existing pond or gravel pit, and the final part, the section in front of the Ruined Abbey, was not completed until the early 1770s. The water surface is about 10 ft (3 m) above the River Mole and there is a retaining dam between the two. The lake has a complex shape, which Michael Symes suggests was "ingeniously devised to furnish variety, illusion and surprise..." Whately observes that the lake "is never seen at once; but by its form, the disposition of some islands, and by the trees in them and on the banks, it always seems larger than it is..." The restoration programme included the removal of islands that had been added after Hamilton had sold the park.

=== Vineyard ===
The Vineyard, adjacent to the Ruined Abbey at the eastern end of the lake, was planted in the mid-1740s. (Note: The Vineyard was one of two areas where vines were grown at Painshill. The second, laid out after the arrival of David Geneste in 1748, was to the north of the Cobham Road, on a detached portion of Hamilton's estate.) For the first few years, productivity was low and so Hamilton recruited David Geneste, an experienced vine grower and Huguenot refugee from Clairac, France. Geneste introduced better cultivation methods and the quality of the wine improved as a result. He continued to work at Painshill until 1757. The Vineyard declined thereafter, and was overplanted with Scots pine in the early 19th century. (Note: Charles Hamilton wrote about the production of wine at Painshill as part of an appendix to Observations, Historical, Medical and Critical, on the Wines of the Ancients by Edward Barry, published in 1775.) Restoration was completed in 1992, when 2 1/2 acres (1 ha) of new vines were planted, and the first full grape harvest took place in 1998.

=== Amphitheatre ===
The Amphitheatre is a formal oval lawn surrounded by evergreen trees and shrubs. It was restored in the late 1980s with species recorded on a plan of a similar area at Worksop Manor, drawn by Robert Petre in the late 1730s. It also features a mature cork oak that may have been planted after Hamilton had left Painshill. The Sabine Group, by Ivor Abrahams, is at the east end of the Amphitheatre and was unveiled in 1992. Sculpted in bronze, it depicts a young woman being abducted by a naked male, who is stepping over her protesting father. The original sculpture in this location, a half-size reproduction in lead of Abduction of a Sabine Woman by Giambologna, was removed from Painshill in the early 1950s, although sources disagree as to whether it was sold or stolen. (Note: Sources disagree as to whether the reproduction in lead of Abduction of a Sabine Woman, originally at the Amphitheatre, was sculpted by Jan van Nost or by John Cheere. Cheere took over the workshop that had been run by van Nost and his son-in-law, Andries Carpentière, near Hyde Park Corner, London, in around 1738.)

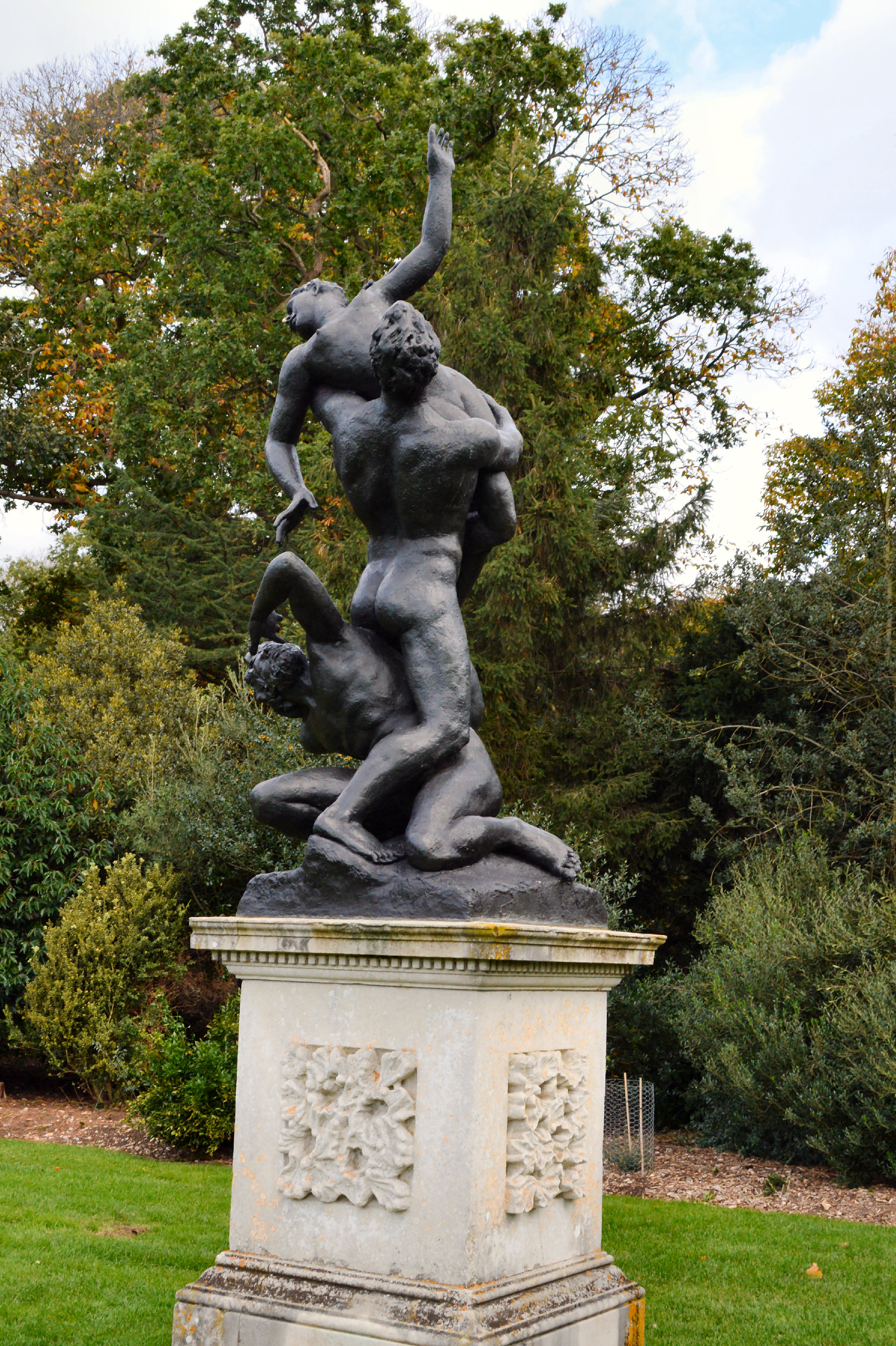
Ivor Abrahams, Sabine Group. 1992. Cast in bronze.

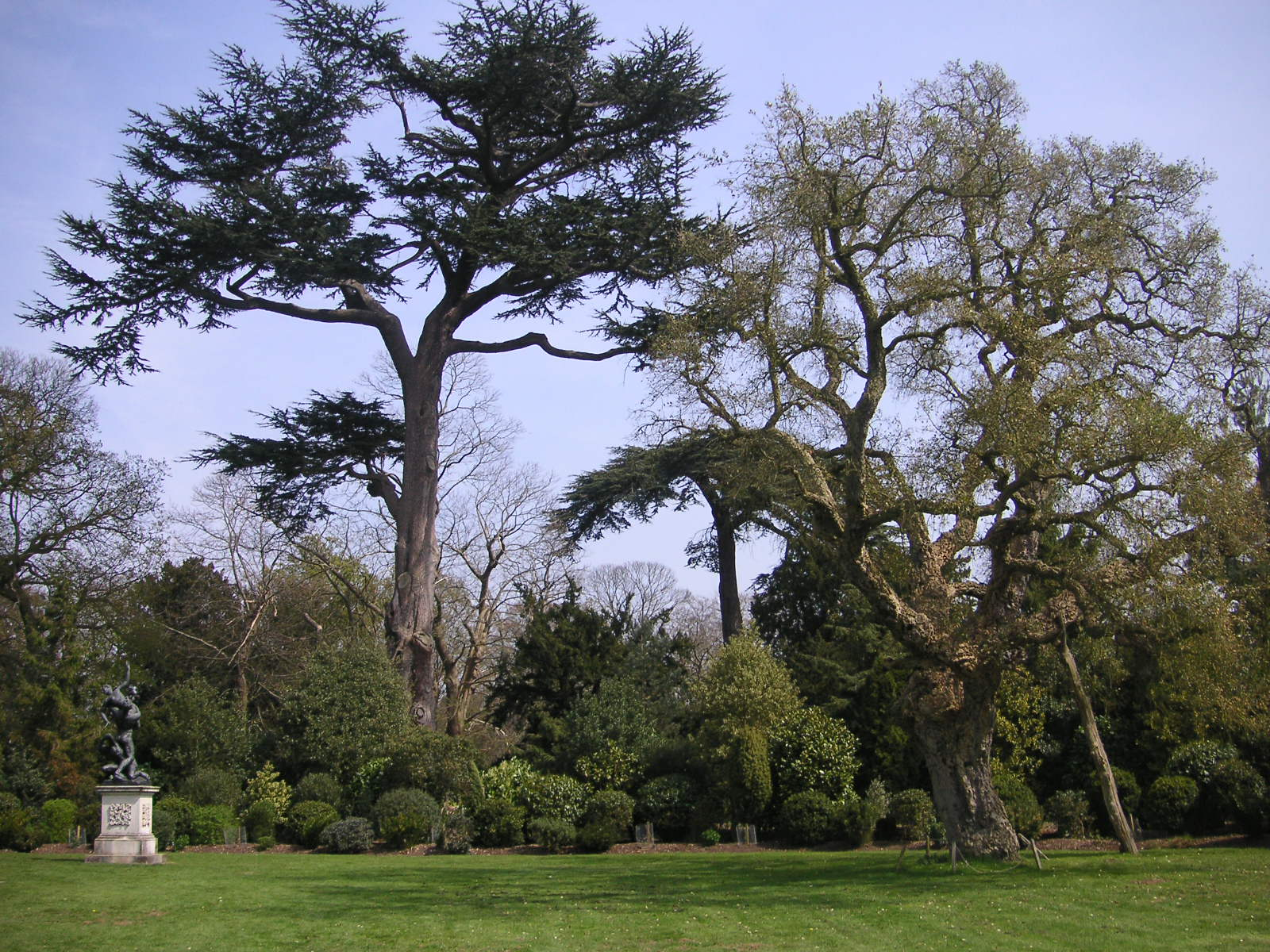
The central lawn of the Amphitheatre, the setting of the Sabine Group

=== Gothic Temple ===
The Grade II*-listed Gothic Temple is a wooden structure, plastered to appear as if made of stone. It overlooks the western half of the lake and provides a panoramic view of the central part of the garden. The structure has ten sides, of which six are open, and the ceiling has a fan vault. Arthur Young, an agriculturist, wrote in 1768: "As the temple is on rising ground, and looks down upon the water, the beauty of the scene is greatly increased. In point of lightness, few buildings exceed this temple." In contrast Horace Walpole was less complimentary, casting doubt on the structure's authenticity, writing in 1761: "The whole is an unmeaning edifice... The Goths never built summerhouses or temples in a garden." The Gothic Temple was the first building at Painshill to be restored. When work started in 1983, it was supported by scaffolding and was close to collapse. The restoration, completed two years later, included the clearance of the hillside between the temple and the lake.

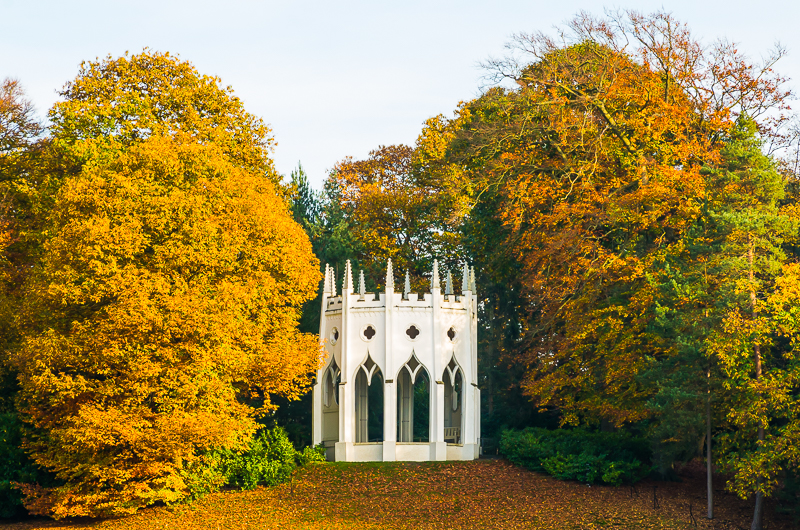
The Gothic Temple from the west

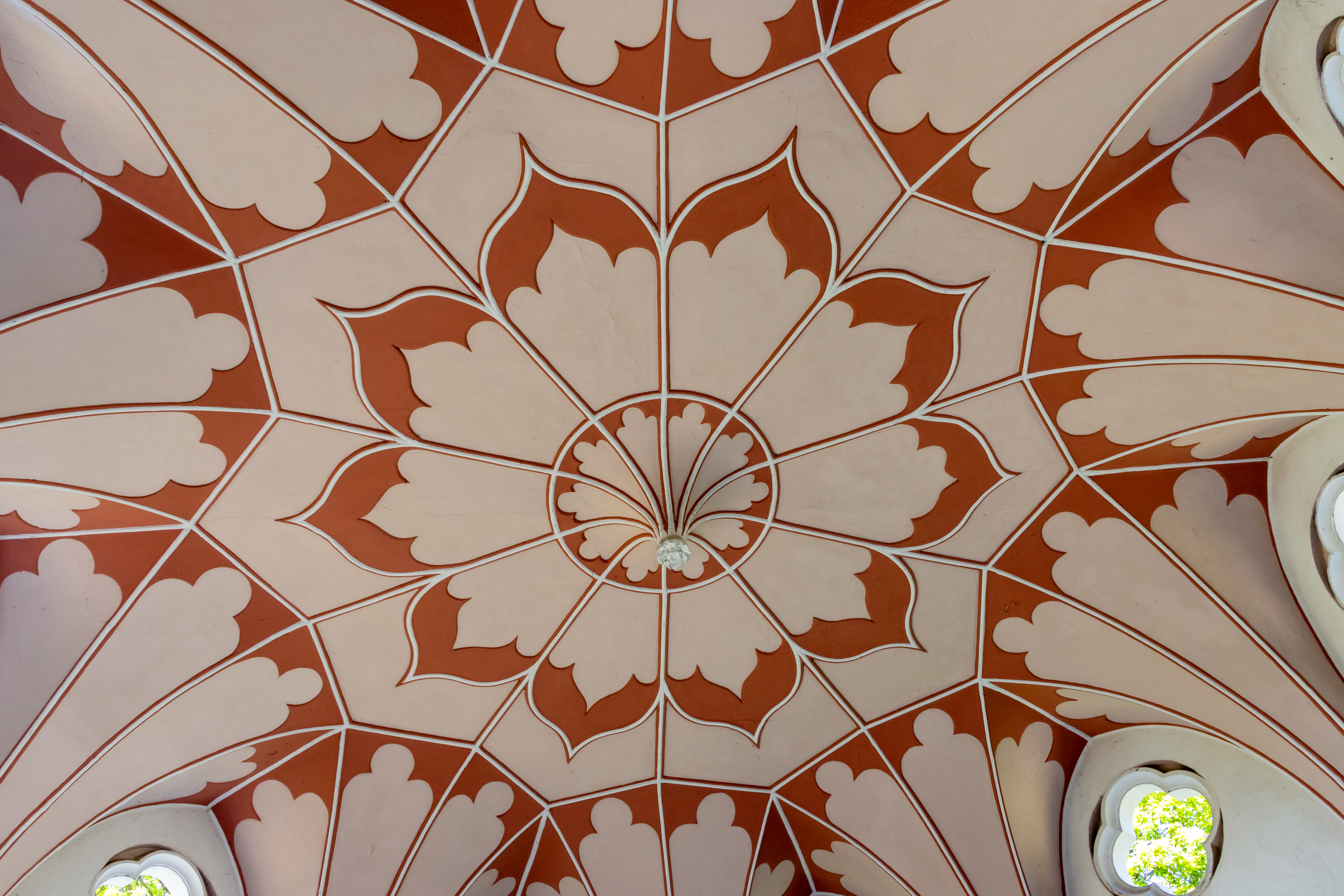
Gothic Temple ceiling

=== Ruined Abbey ===
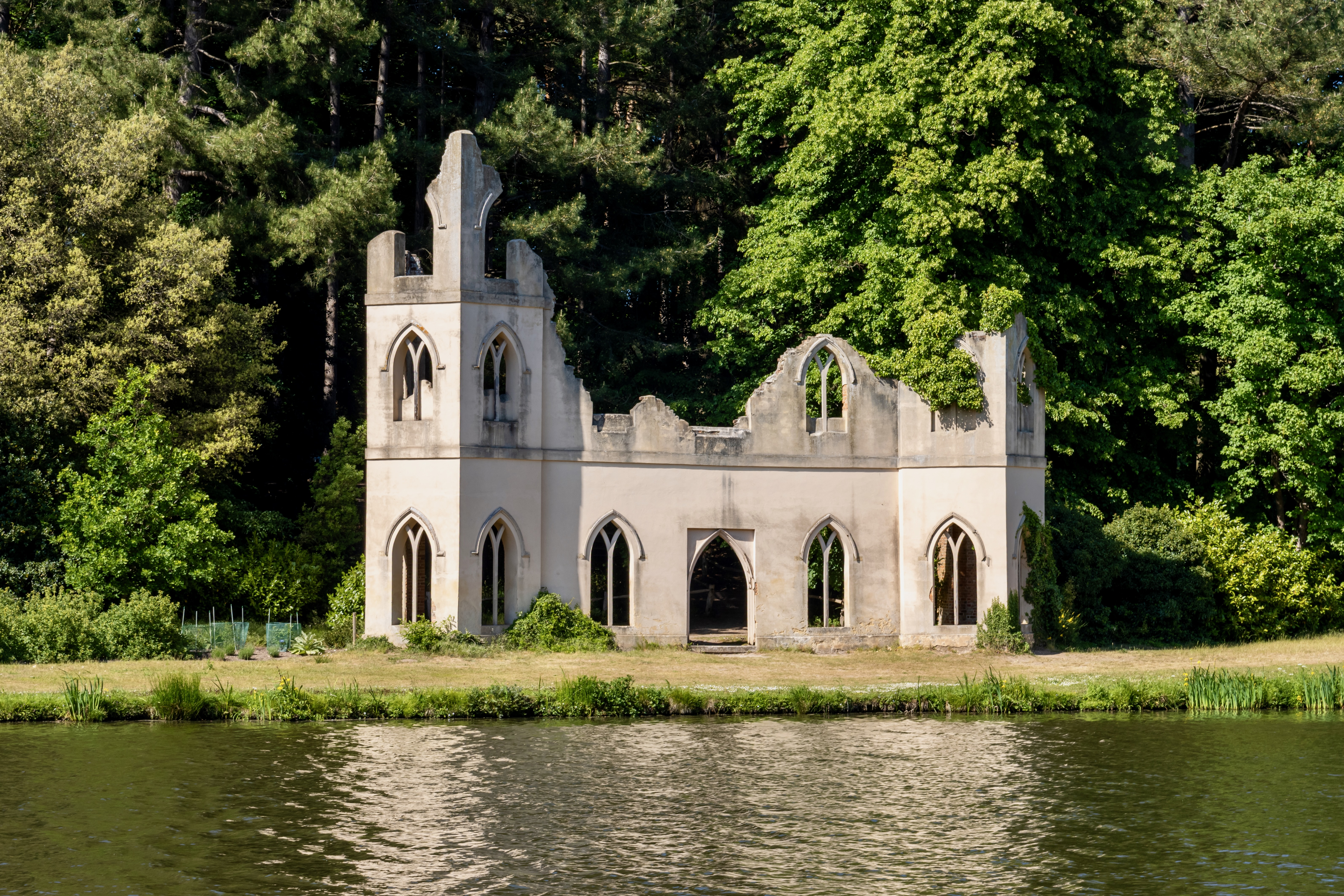
Ruined Abbey from the south

The Grade II-listed Ruined Abbey, on the northern side of the lake, was the last building to be constructed at Painshill by Hamilton and is not part of the circuit. It was built to conceal the unsuccessful brickworks and was completed in the early 1770s. Although it originally had a roof and a wall at the rear, in its restored condition it consists of a brick façade, plastered to appear made of stone. Tim Richardson observes that the abbey is "wholly unconvincing either as architectural pastiche or as a genuine ruin", but concedes that it is "effective nevertheless in its stark, limewashed incongruity". He further comments that the structure is "perhaps best enjoyed romantically as a reflection in the stillness of the water."

=== Chinese Bridge ===
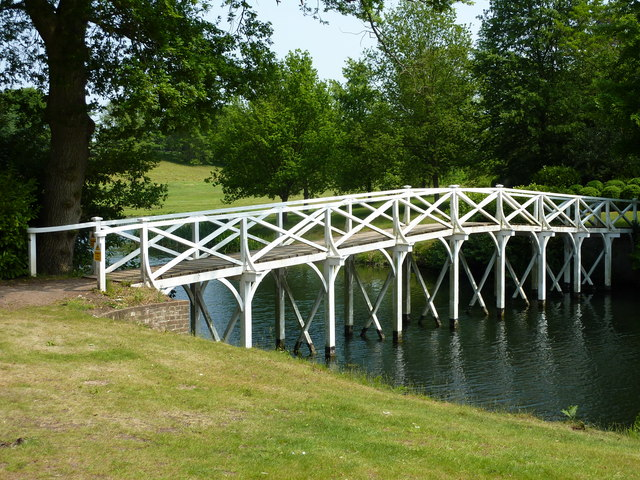
The Chinese Bridge

The Grade II-listed Chinese Bridge is one of three wooden bridges built by Hamilton at Painshill. Ronald Yee suggests that the designs may have been inspired by I quattro libri dell'architettura by Andrea Palladio, translated into English as The Four Books of Architecture by Isaac Ware in 1738. The Chinese Bridge links the Chinese Peninsula to Grotto Island. It has nine spans, is around 5 ft (1.5 m) wide and has a total length of around 72 ft (22 m). The name is a misnomer, based on the false premise that the cross bracing supporting the handrails is an Oriental motif, when in fact it is a Palladian style. Symes suggests that the misunderstanding is a reflection of the mid-18th century fashion for chinoiserie and notes that similar structures were common in landscape gardens in England during this period. The restoration of the Chinese Bridge was completed in 1988, but the structure was closed in 2023 after concerns were raised over the stability of the supporting pillars.

=== Grotto ===
The Grade II-listed Grotto, on Grotto Island, was constructed in the 1760s by Joseph Lane and is the largest in England. It consists of an entrance arch and a 60 ft-long (18 m) tunnel passageway, leading to a main chamber which is around 36 ft (11 m) in diameter. The walls are built of brick and the roof is timber, but the exterior surfaces are covered with tufa limestone. The interior is decorated with a wide range of crystalline mineral stones, including quartz, feldspar and Blue John. The main chamber is primarily lit by openings onto the lake, with light reflecting off the water surface. (Note: Archaeological surveys in the early 1980s revealed that the reflecting pools in the Grotto were originally fed by underground pipework from a pump house on Grotto Island. The pump house is thought to have housed an Archimedes' screw, which raised water from the lake to a well, hidden behind the east wall of the Grotto, from where it could feed the cascades in the main chamber.)

Fredrik Magnus Piper, a Swedish architect who visited Painshill in 1779, described the interior of the Grotto as containing: "transparent spars, stalactites, crystallisations and the like, some descending from the vault in the form of hanging pyramids, chandeliers and baldachins, some rising like pillars from the floor. These catch the sunbeams which are reflected from the surface of the water outside and break into the grotto." Richardson notes that, compared with its contemporaries, the Grotto at Painshill is "fairly monochromatic, allows in lots of light, contains no shellwork and includes many more stalactites." He suggests that Hamilton and Lane intended to create "a geologically convincing scheme."

By the time the borough council had bought Painshill in the late 1970s, the Grotto was derelict and its internal decoration had disappeared. The roof is thought to have collapsed in the mid-1940s, after the lead flashing was sold to finance VE Day celebrations. Restoration began in 1986 and was completed in 2013.

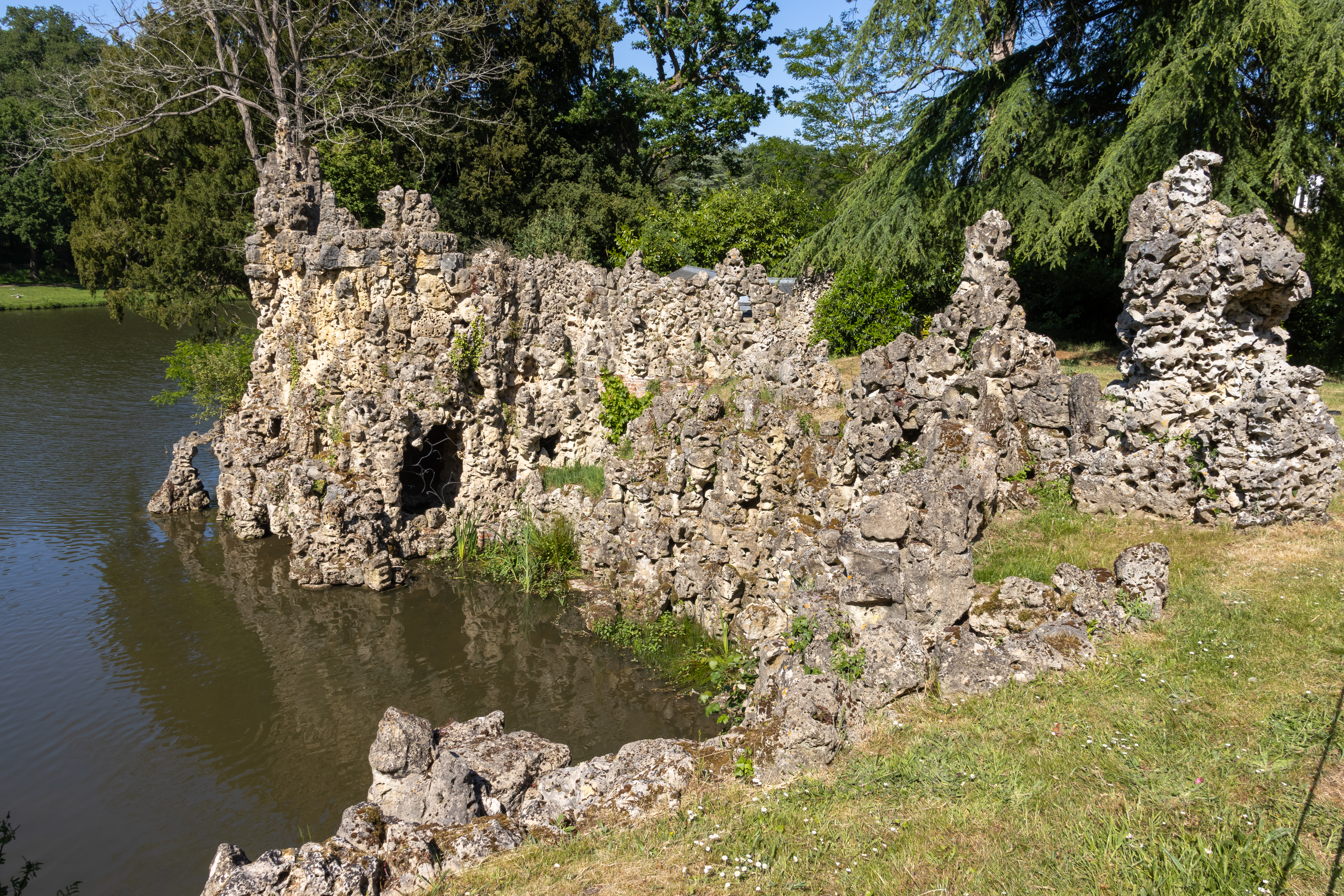
The exterior of the Grotto

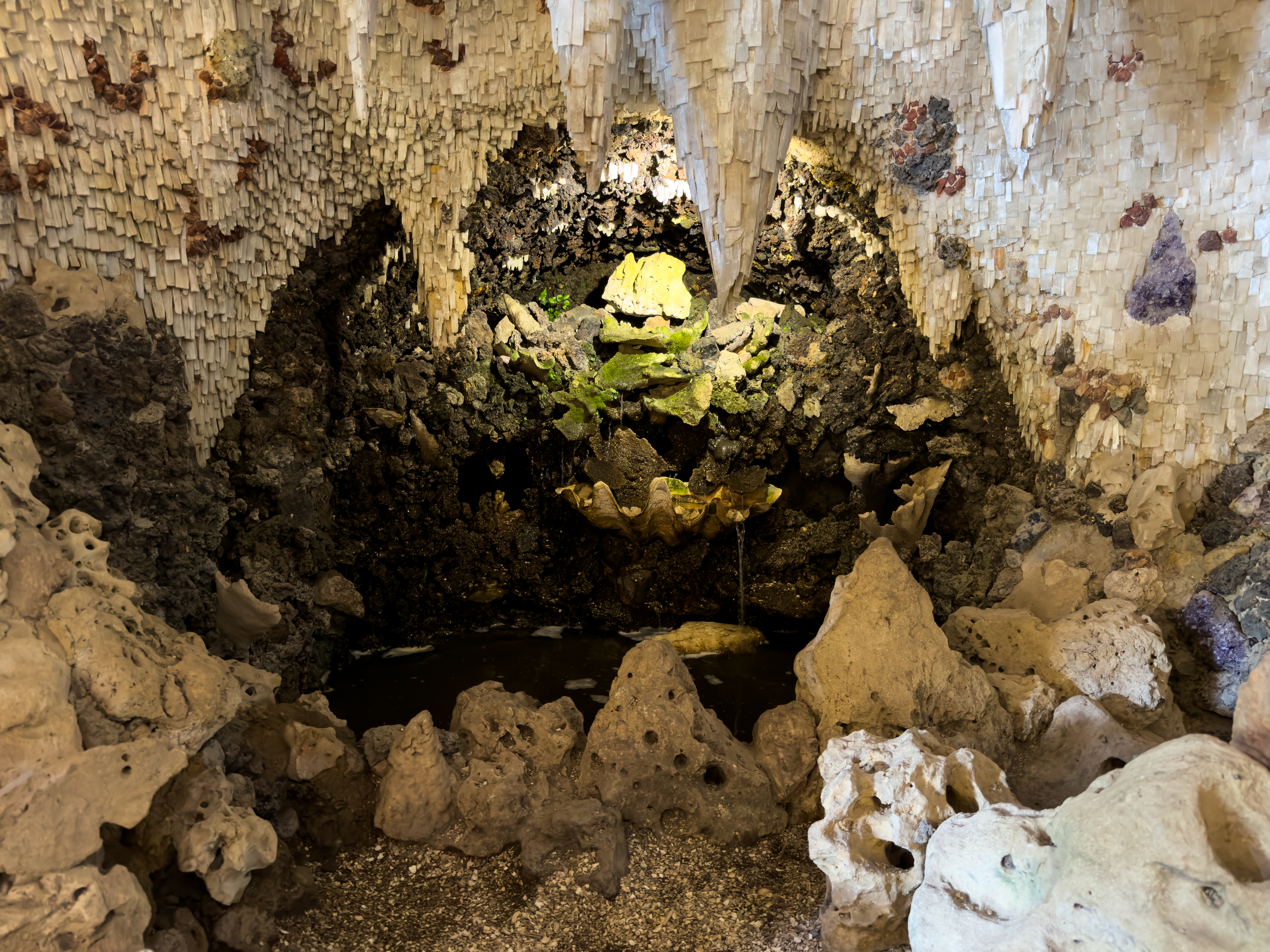
Reflecting pool in the main chamber

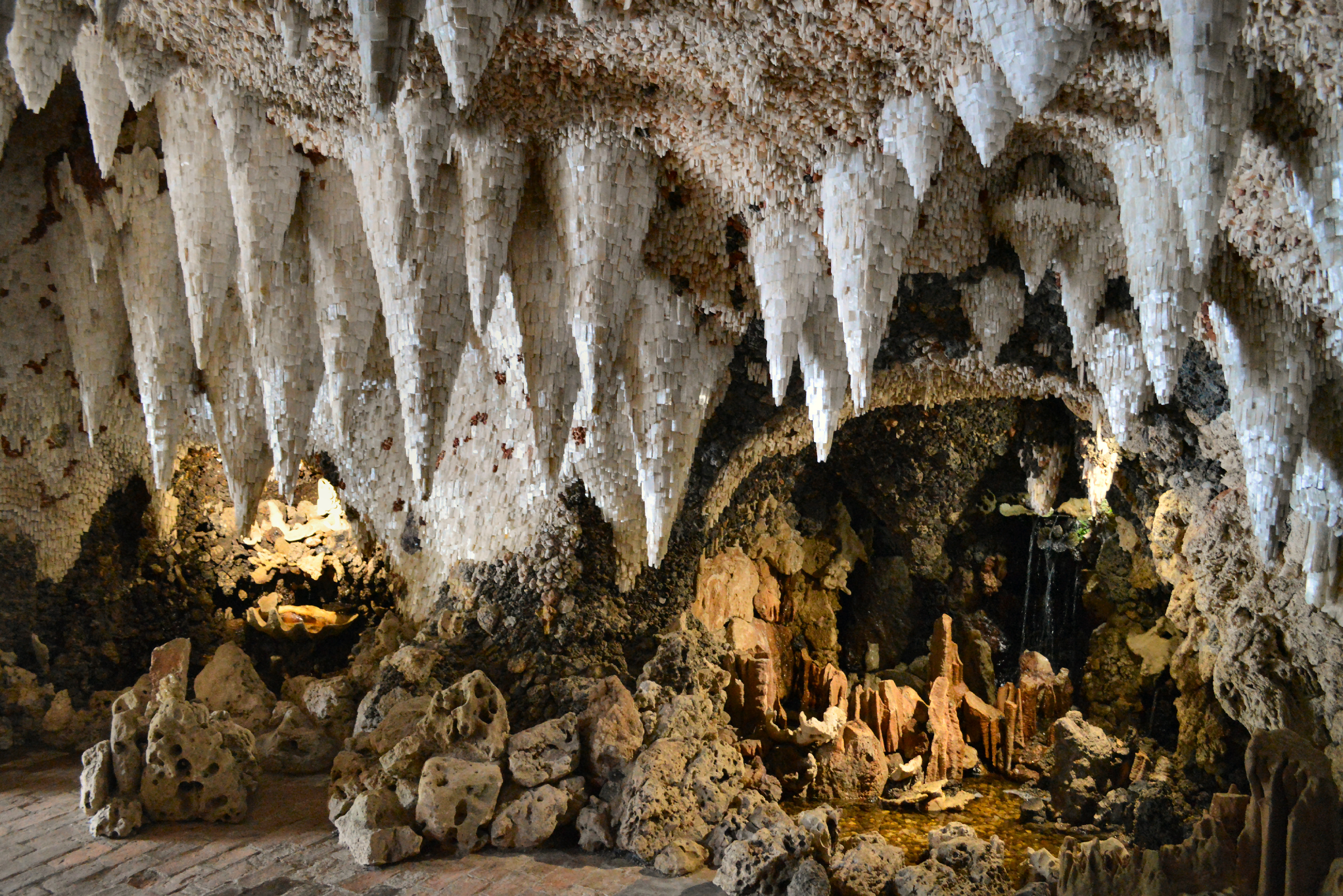
The interior of the Grotto

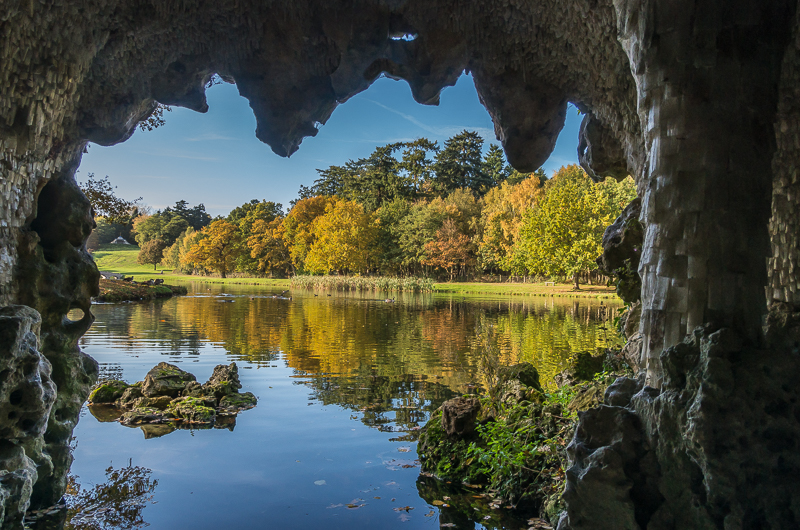
The lake from inside the Grotto

=== Woollett Bridge ===
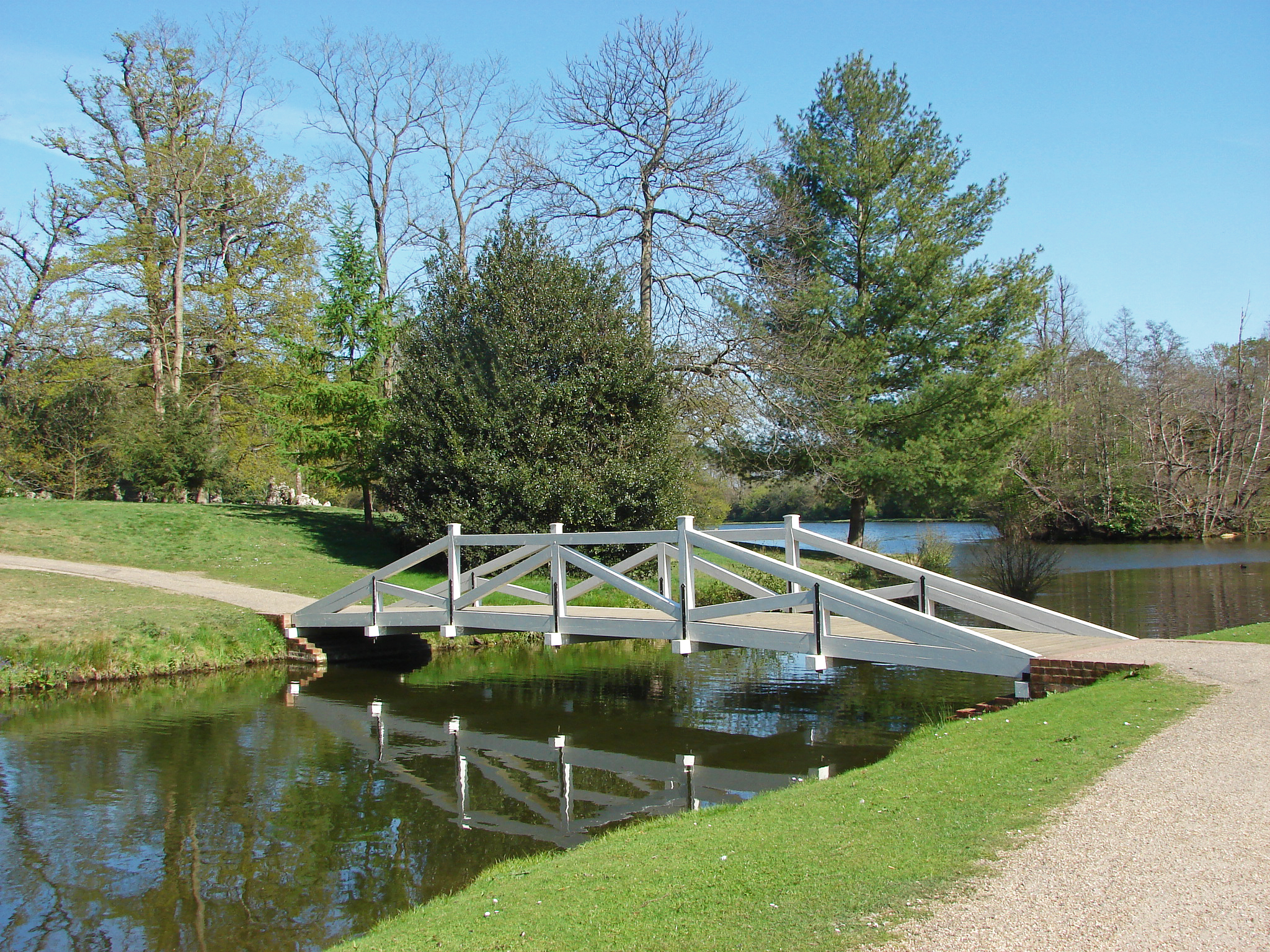
The recreated Woollett Bridge

The timber Woollett Bridge links Grotto Island to the western bank of the lake and has a total length of around 50 ft (15 m). First erected in the 1750s, it is named after William Woollett, whose engraving shows the structure in the 1760s. It was built as a copy of a truss bridge over the Cismon in northern Italy, designed by Palladio. The Woollett Bridge was replaced by a Chinese-style bridge in around 1770, but was reinstated to the original design in 2012. During the 2019–20 United Kingdom floods, the bridge was submerged on two occasions and the wood began to rot. A restoration project was launched and was completed in 2022.

=== Mausoleum ===
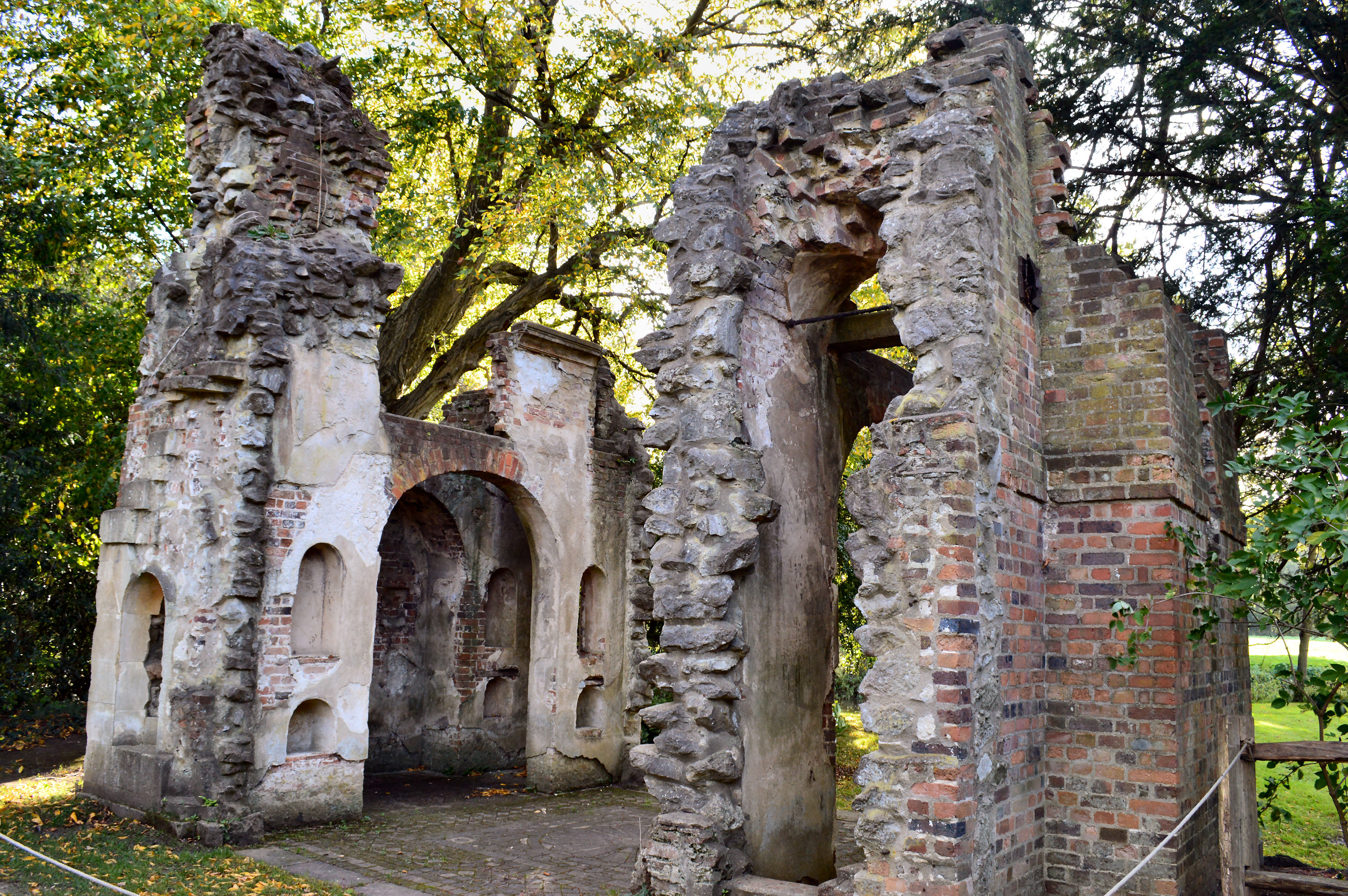
The Mausoleum

The Grade II-listed Mausoleum was built overlooking a meander in the River Mole and was designed to resemble a ruined Roman arch. In Hamilton's time, the recesses in the walls were occupied by funeral urns, a sarcophagus and other classical artifacts, and the surrounding area was planted with dark-leaved evergreens, including yews, to generate a sombre atmosphere. Walpole was critical of the structure, which he described as a columbarium, writing: "The Ruin... has great faults... The upper row of niches... are too high & in proportion more gothic than Roman. The tesselated [sic] pavement unluckily resembles a painted oil-cloth." In the late 1980s, a partial restoration was undertaken to stabilise the remains of the Mausoleum and to relay the original floor, although the main arch span was not reconstructed.

=== Five Arch Bridge ===
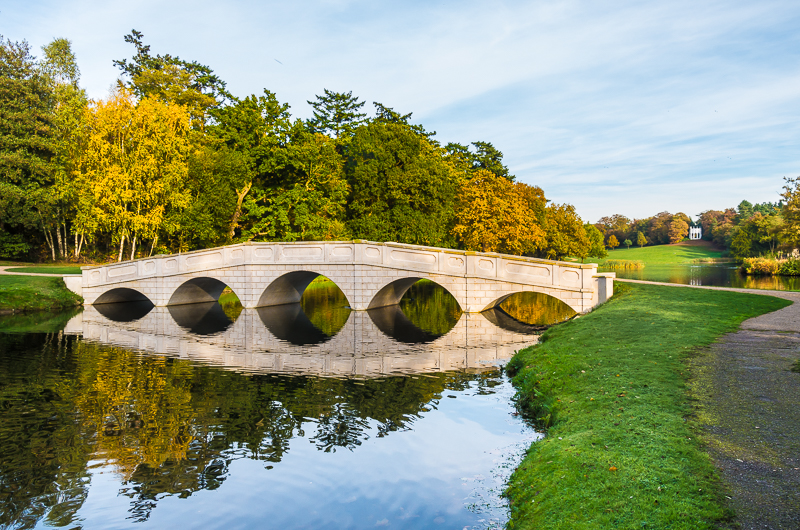
The recreated Five Arch Bridge with the Gothic Temple in the distance

The Five Arch Bridge provides a focus for the views from the Gothic Temple and the Turkish Tent over the western part of the lake. The design was based on a drawing by Palladio of the Roman Ponte di Tiberio in Rimini, Italy. The original bridge was constructed in wood, plastered to appear as if made of stone. By the early 1980s, the structure had been replaced by an earth causeway, but an archaeological investigation, undertaken when the water level in the lake was low, was able to identify and survey the foundations of the original piers. In 2013, the bridge was reinstated in white concrete with copings in Portland stone.

=== Cascade ===
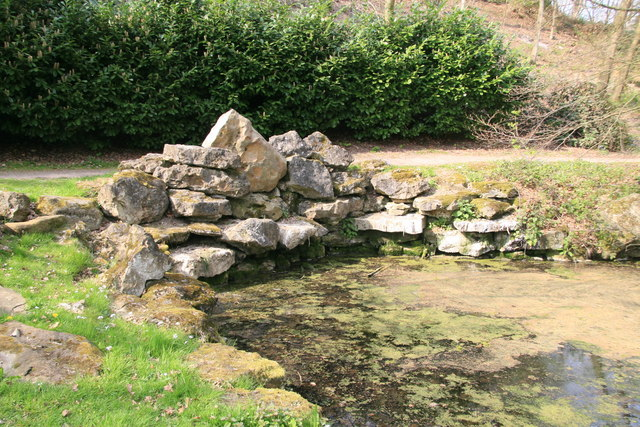
The Cascade at the west end of the lake

The Cascade is thought to have been completed around 1760 and may have been built by Joseph Pickford, the stonemason who constructed the Grotto at Claremont. It was designed to conceal the pipework that fed water raised from the Mole into the lake. Young wrote in 1768: "The water gushes in five or six streams, out of tufts of weeds, growing in the rock; really in the very taste of nature". Symes suggests that although the Cascade at Painshill is a relatively early example, Hamilton may have drawn inspiration from similar features at Virginia Water and Stowe.

=== Waterwheel ===
The design of the first waterwheel to raise water from the Mole to the lake at Painshill is attributed by Richard Pococke, a clergyman and writer, to Hamilton personally. In a travelogue published in 1889, Pococke describes the wheel as having "four spiral square pipes from the radius to the center [sic]... it conveys the water to the axel where 'tis emptied, and the water is convey'd by pipes [to the lake]". The wheel was replaced in 1770 by a horse-operated pump, consisting of a series of 24-imperial-gallon (110 L) buckets attached to a looped chain. This mechanism had been replaced by a new wheel by 1779, when Piper produced a detailed drawing. A third wheel was purchased in the 1780s or early 1790s, before the Waterwheel manufactured by Bramah was installed in the 1830s. The 32 ft (9.8 m) diameter undershot wheel cost £800 (equivalent to £77,000 in 2025) and is Grade II listed. Restoration began in 1986 and was completed two years later. Although most of the mechanism had survived, the wheel had not turned since the mid-1950s and was badly rusted.

=== Hermitage ===
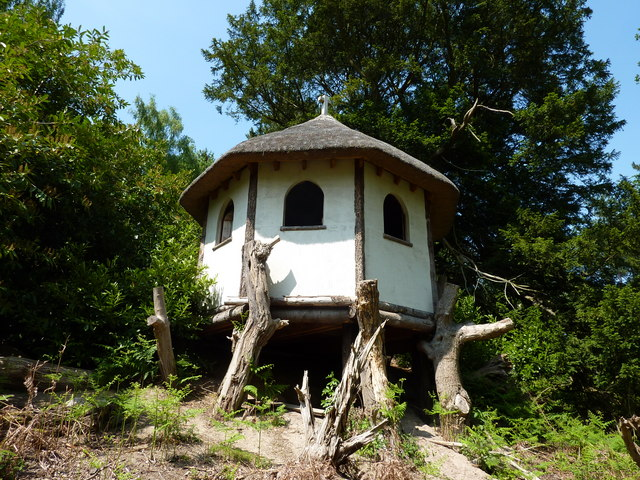
The recreated Hermitage

The Hermitage was built to resemble a tree house when viewed from the front and is elevated above the sloping ground below. It has a thatched roof and is divided into a living room and bedroom. It is thought to be one of the earliest follies at Painshill and is first recorded in 1752 by Joseph Spence. (Note: Michael Symes suggests that the Hermitage was built on the site of the Chinese Seat, the earliest known folly at Painshill, of which only one record (from 1748) exists. Ralph Dutton, a historian of country houses and gardens, attributes the design of the Hermitage and other aspects of Painshill to William Kent (c. 1685–1748).) John Parnell described the approach to the structure in 1763: "You strike into a wood of different firs, acacias, etc, and serpentining through it arrive at a hermitage formed to the front with the trunks of fir trees with their bark on, their branches making natural gothic windows." Hamilton employed a man to live in the building as a hermit for a period of seven years, but he was dismissed three weeks later after visiting a local inn. Although the ruins of the original structure were still present in 1897, all traces had disappeared by the late 1940s. The Hermitage was reinstated in 2004, and a new hermit took up temporary residence that year.

=== Gothic Tower ===
The 60 ft-tall (18 m) Gothic Tower is at the far western corner of the park and is Grade II* listed. It is thought to have been inspired by a belvedere at Claremont, designed by John Vanbrugh in around 1716. The four-storey brick building was originally limewashed and was used by Hamilton to display part of his collection of sculptures. The tower was severely damaged by a fire in the mid-1970s, which destroyed the roof and staircase. The restoration project, begun in 1986 and completed in 1989, provided a tea room and exhibition space, as well as accommodation for a park ranger.

=== Temple of Bacchus ===
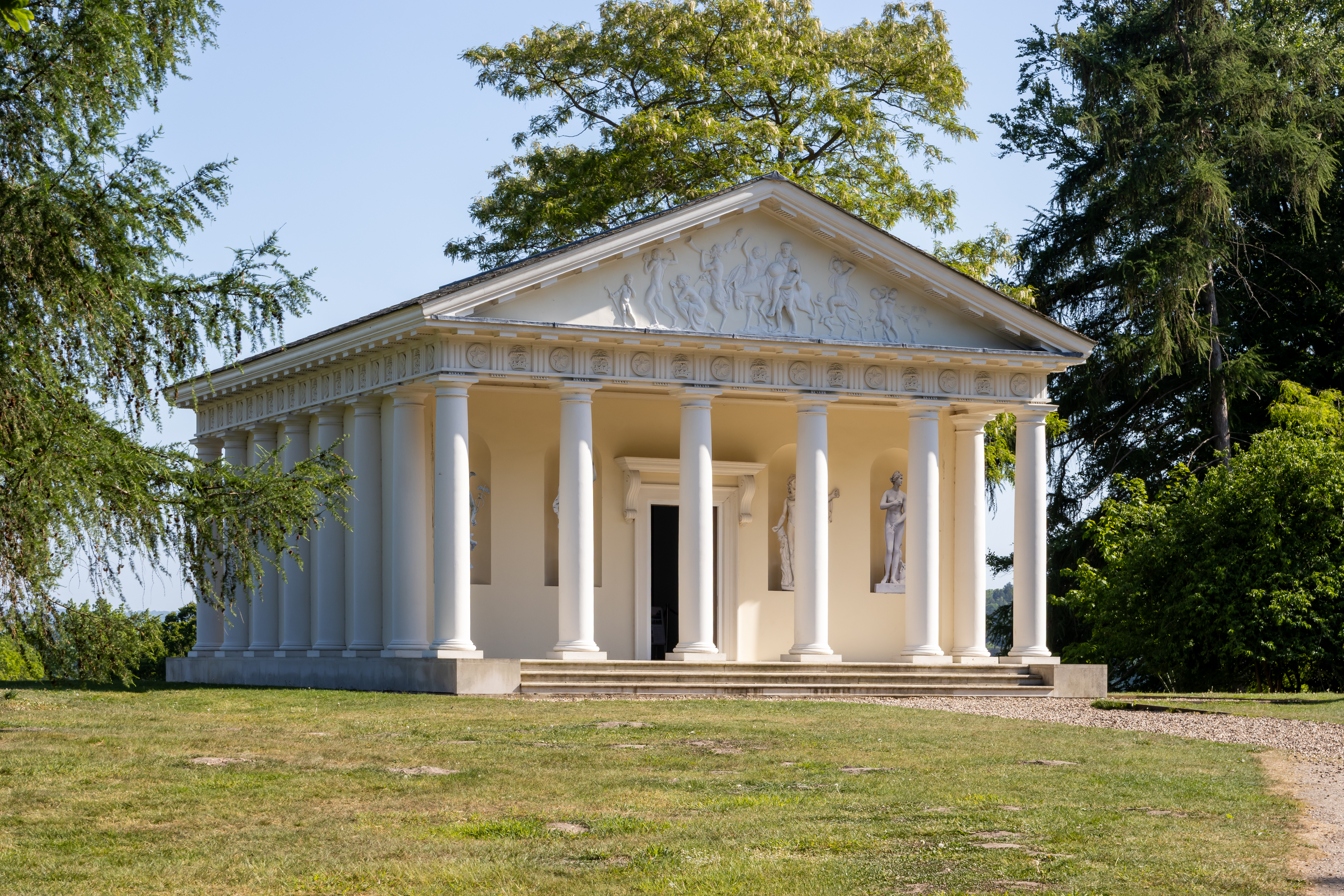
The recreated Temple of Bacchus

The Temple of Bacchus was completed by October 1762. It was based on the Maison carrée at Nîmes, France, and may have been designed by Robert Adam. It was built with Roman Doric columns and was intended to display the statue of Bacchus that Hamilton purchased in Rome. Whately described the temple and its setting in 1770 as "a scene polished to the highest degree of improvement". The statue was sold to William Beckford in 1792 and passed through several private owners before it was installed at Anglesey Abbey, Cambridgeshire, in 1928. The columns and frieze were removed from the temple and were relocated to form a new porch at Painshill House in 1925, although the rest of the structure remained standing until the late 1940s. A cast of the statue of Bacchus was installed at Painshill in 2008, and the Temple of Bacchus was rebuilt in 2018.

=== Turkish Tent ===
The Turkish Tent was installed at Painshill in around 1760. It was based on a design by Henry Keene and may have been inspired by a similar installation at Vauxhall Gardens. Clive Aslet and Nebahat Avcioğlu suggest that it represents the legendary Tent of Darius, in which Alexander the Great supposedly freed the women and slaves of Darius III after defeating the Persians in battle. In contrast, Mavis Collier and David Wrightson argue that Hamilton was simply following a fashionable trend of erecting Oriental-style tents, and Andrew Zega and Bernd H. Dams note that 18th-century landowners built these "inexpensive" structures "prolifically in their gardens, indiscriminately labeling them as Tartar, Turkish, Siamese or Chinese."

Excavation work in 1985 revealed the brick floor of the first tent, from which dimensions could be calculated. It was not possible to reinstate the structure on its original site, which is mostly part of the Heyswood campsite, and so the replacement was erected to the south wholly on borough council land. The current Turkish Tent is a 20 ft-tall (6.1 m) rigid structure, supported by a circular brick internal wall and metal stanchions. The external parts of the new structure are made of fibreglass, instead of the original painted canvas. Christopher Thacker, a garden historian, suggests that the "'best' view" at Painshill could be obtained from the original site of the Turkish Tent "both outwards – to the south, beyond the Mole – and across the gardens..." and that Hamilton had intended to build himself a new mansion there.

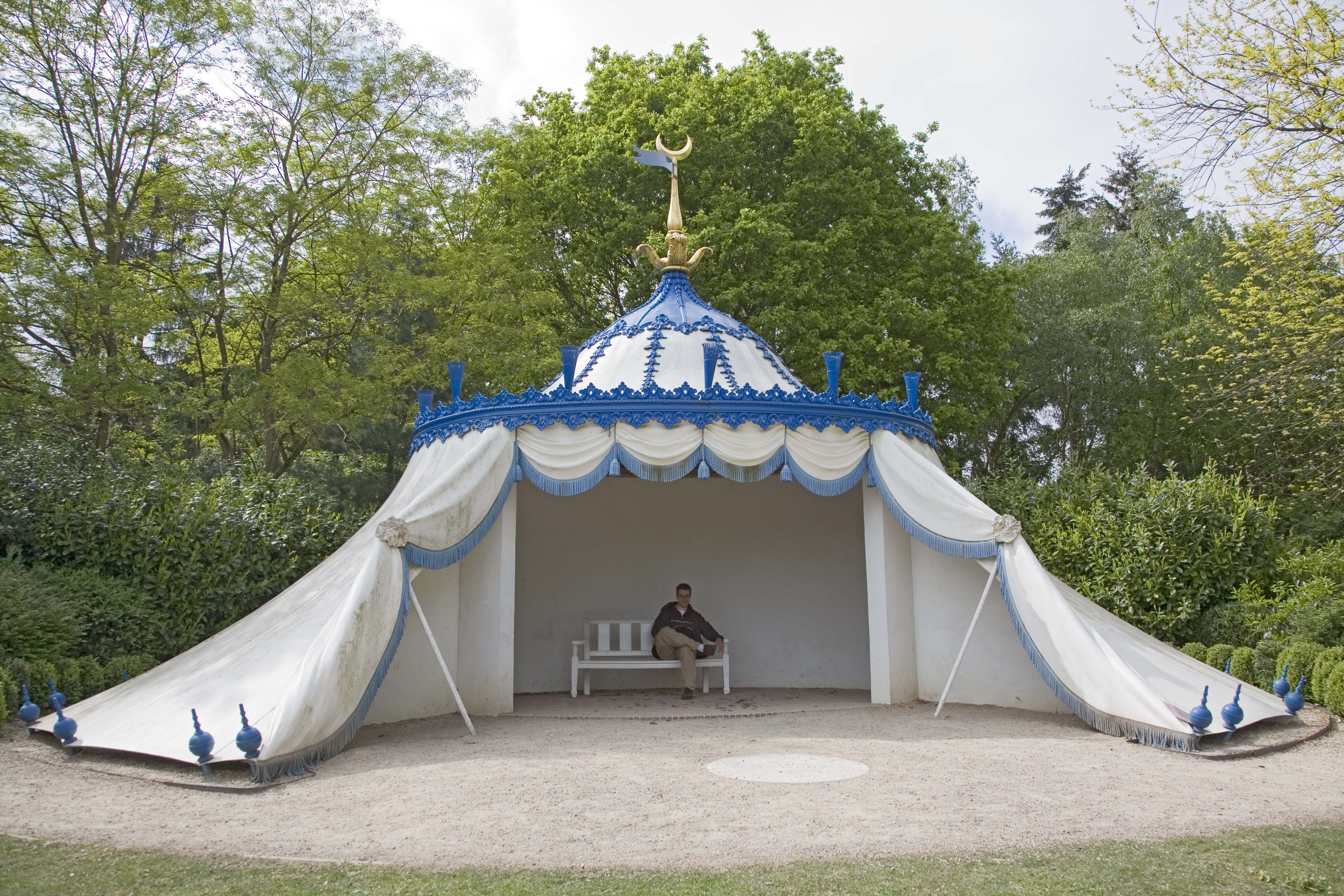
The recreated Turkish Tent

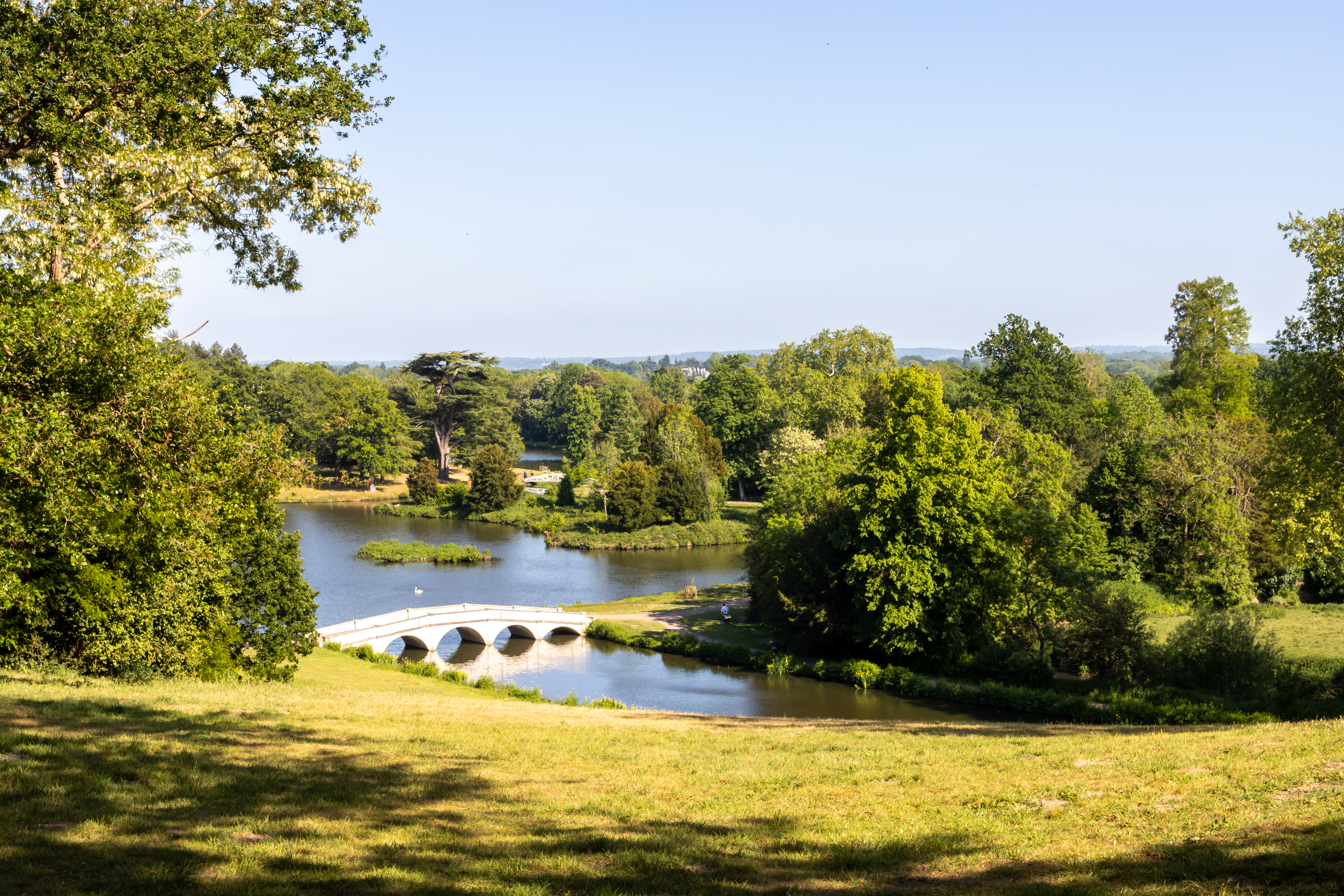
View from the Turkish Tent towards the Five Arch Bridge, Woollett Bridge and Cobham Park

=== Keyhole ===
The Keyhole is a circular plantation of trees close to Painshill Park House. It consists of seven concentric rings of beeches and pines, and contrasts with the plantings of exotics elsewhere in the park. It is shown on the map of Painshill dated 1744 by John Rocque, and Symes suggests that it may have been inspired by similar circular features at the Villa Ludovisi and the Villa di Castello in Italy. Close by is the Ice House, which was commissioned by Henry Luttrell.

=== Walled Gardens ===
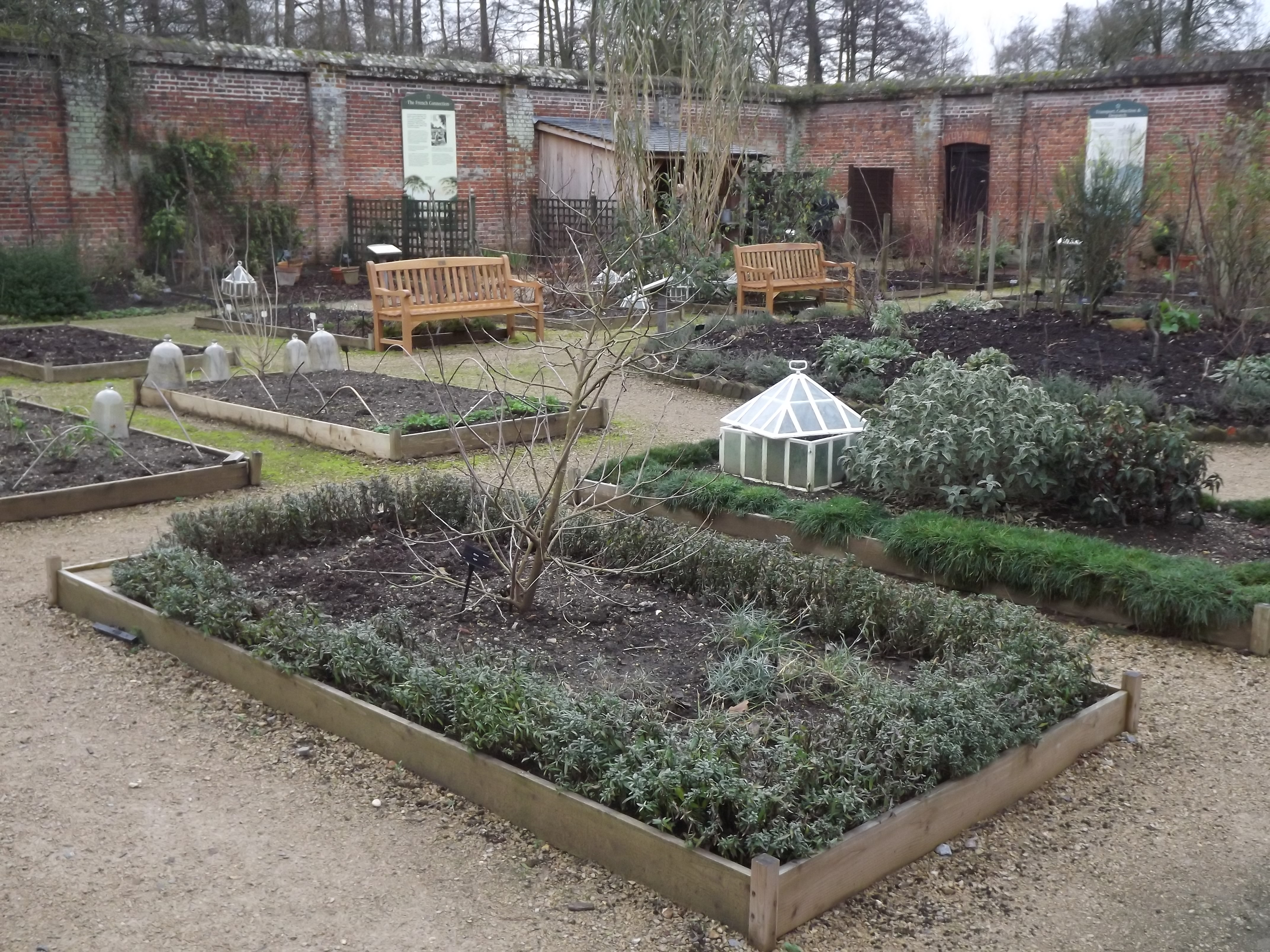
Interior of the restored Walled Gardens

The Grade II-listed Walled Gardens, at the east end of the park, were built in 1756. They consist of three brick enclosures, arranged in an "L" shape. Primarily used as a kitchen garden for herbs, fruit and vegetables, one of the enclosures contained a heated greenhouse, in which pineapples were grown.

=== Visitor Centre ===
The Visitor Centre was designed by the architectural firm, Feilden Clegg Bradley. The timber-clad building, which provides café facilities and a teaching area for schoolchildren, was completed in 2001. The footbridge over the Mole, between the car park and the Visitor Centre, was completed in mid-July 1997 and includes a drawbridge section to close the park at night. Designed by Kim Grady, it is built of tubular steel with splayed arches, one either side of the deck. It has a total span of around 115 ft (35 m) and is 9.8 ft (3 m) wide. It was part of a project funded by a National Lottery grant, that also included the construction of the ticket office.

== Cultural context ==
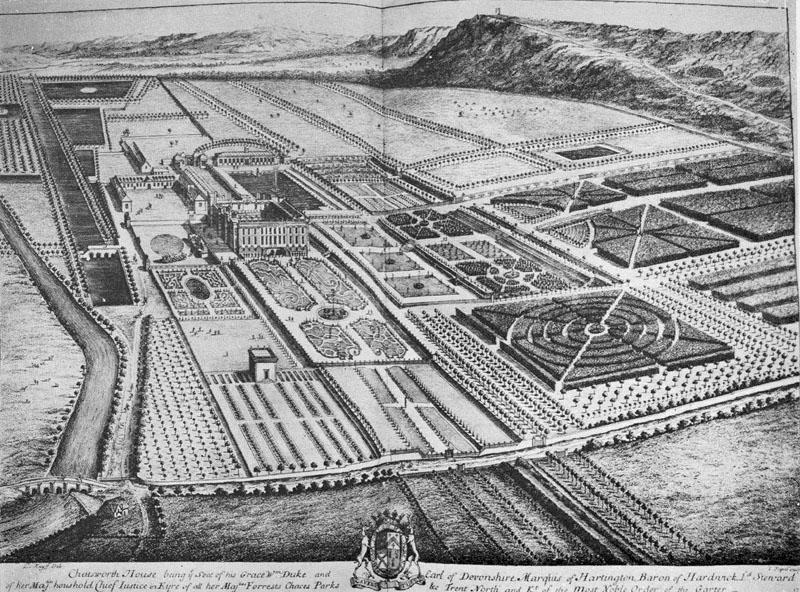
The Baroque garden at Chatsworth House: An engraving by Jan Kip and Leonard Knijff from 1699

At the start of the 18th century, the majority of gardens in England were of the formal Baroque type, often focused on a rectangular parterre with areas of planting separated by evergreen hedging and gravel pathways. However, the economic climate of the period meant that this style was becoming increasingly unsustainable. The War of the Spanish Succession and the collapse of the South Sea Company contributed to the strain on the finances of the British state and the aristocracy, and early in Queen Anne's reign, Henry Wise was instructed to reduce the cost of maintaining the royal gardens by two thirds. Christopher Hussey, an architectural historian, writes that the emergence of landscape gardens "seems to be traceable to the common English predilections for seeking to effect economies... and for sport." In particular he notes that the new style allowed the land to be laid out for horse riding and carriage driving, and that "providing a grand static view from a window or terrace" was a lesser priority.

The change in garden design was also influenced by the evolution of political philosophies in Britain. As the importance of the royal court diminished following the Glorious Revolution of 1688, landowners became more focused on developing their country estates. Charles Hamilton was part of a circle of Patriot Whigs connected to Frederick, Prince of Wales, many of whose members created landscape gardens in the early 18th century. This group included Richard Temple, 1st Viscount Cobham (owner of Stowe), Francis North, 1st Earl of Guilford (owner of Wroxton Abbey) and George Lyttelton, 1st Baron Lyttelton (owner of Hagley Hall). (Note: Hamilton chose a "'libertarian' Gothic" style for the early follies at Painshill, which was in fashion among those in Prince Frederick's circle, although Tim Richardson suggests that this was for aesthetic rather than political reasons.) They, like many other Whigs, sought to redevelop their Baroque gardens, which they believed were too closely associated with the absolute monarchies of Europe. As Andrea Wulf, a historian of science, writes: "gardens like Painshill... allow you to experience, in its true glory, that revolutionary time when English gardeners dug up their topiary and planted a new world."

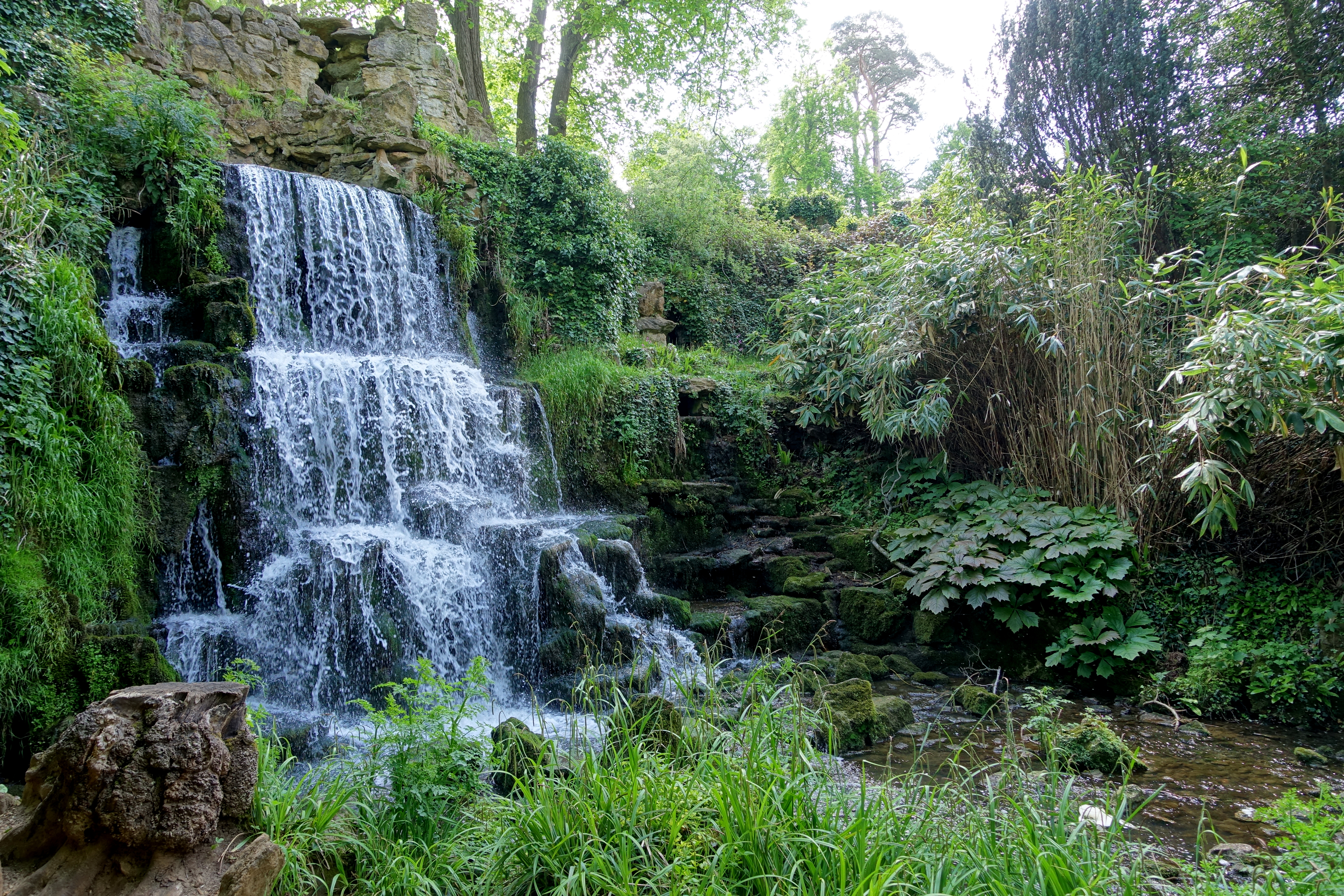
The Cascade at Bowood, designed by Charles Hamilton for John Petty, 1st Earl of Shelburne

Like many young aristocrats in the early 18th century, Hamilton visited continental Europe, embarking on two Grand Tours in 1725–1727 and 1731–1734. His ideas were shaped by the artworks that he encountered in Italy and by the landscapes of Claude Lorrain, Nicolas and Gaspard Poussin, and Salvator Rosa in particular. At Painshill, Stephanie Ross notes the similarities with paintings by Claude in the plan of the garden with the lake at its centre, and Paula Deitz suggests that the "quiet aloofness" of the Temple of Bacchus echoes the style of the same artist. H. F. Clark identifies Rosa's influence in the design of the Cascade, describing it as a "slice of the Alps... at the head of the lake", contrasting it to a similar feature that Hamilton designed at Bowood, which he likens to "a picture by Gaspard Poussin."

William Robertson, an Irish architect who visited Painshill in 1795, also acknowledges the influence of landscapes on the garden, writing: "Mr Hamilton studied painting for the express purpose of improving this place and such was his passion for planning and ornamenting that he expended the greater part of a fine property on this place." Stephanie Ross argues that Hamilton did not set out to copy specific artworks, but instead used the techniques of landscape painting to create the vistas and scenes at Painshill.

The ideal of the Picturesque began to influence garden design in England from the 1730s onwards. A forerunner of romanticism, it emphasised the importance of pictorial values in the creation and appreciation of artworks, buildings and landscapes, and challenged Enlightenment and rationalist views of aesthetics. One of its principal promoters, William Gilpin, defined Picturesque as "a term expressive of that peculiar kind of beauty, which is agreeable in a picture", and proposed that landscape should be viewed in the same way as a painting, incorporating ruggedness, variety, and architectural elements. Another advocate of the ideal, Uvedale Price, argued that the concept could be "applied to every object, and every kind of scenery, which has been or might be represented with good effect in painting."

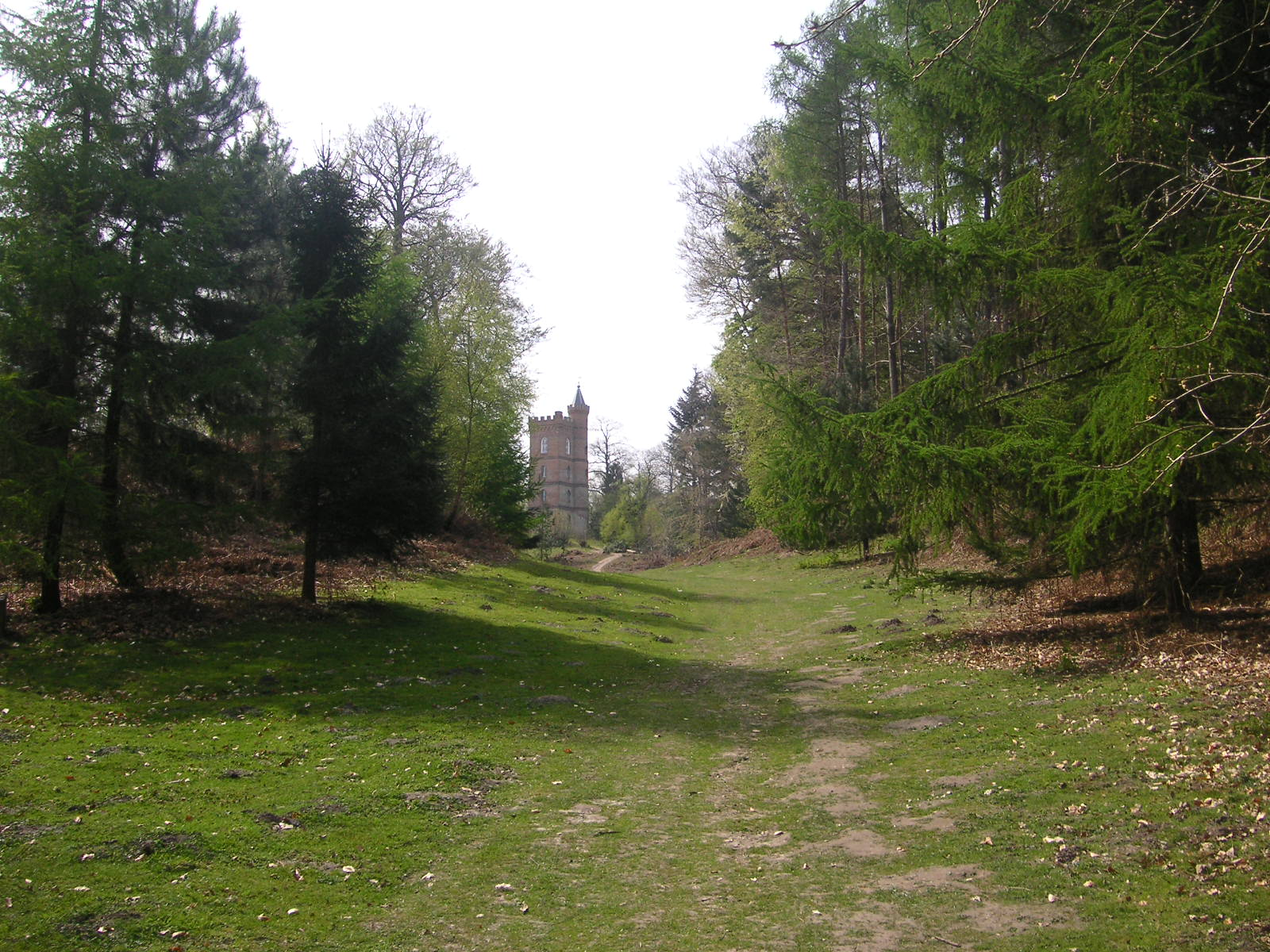
The Alpine Valley leading to the Gothic Tower was praised by Horace Walpole

Hussey describes Painshill as a "proto-Picturesque garden", and Hamilton's design of the Gothic Tower was certainly influenced by the work of John Vanbrugh, who was recognised by Price as one of the originators of the ideal. (Note: In June 1709, John Vanbrugh argued against the removal of the remains of Old Woodstock Manor in the park at Blenheim Palace, writing that "Buildings, And Plantations... rightly dispos'd will indeed Supply all the wants of Nature in that Place. And the Most agreeable Disposition is to Mix them". Christopher Hussey, the architectural historian, considers Vanbrugh's retention of the ruins to be the earliest example in garden design of an ancient building being preserved on aesthetic grounds, but also notes that the decision saved £1000 in demolition costs.) Several leading proponents of the Picturesque were complimentary of Hamilton's park and of the western part in particular, which Horace Walpole likens to a "kind of Alpine scene". He continues, "the walks seem not designed, but cut through the woods of pines; and the style of the whole is so grand, and conducted with so serious an air of wild and uncultivated extent, that when you look down on this seeming forest, you are amazed to find it contains a very few acres."

Hamilton may have been influenced by the ferme ornée style, an early example of which was developed in the early 1730s by Philip Southcote at Woburn Farm, also in north Surrey. Whately visited the 150-acre (61 ha) farm in 1770, noting that around 35 acres (14 ha) were "adorned to the highest degree". The concept of a ferme ornée is described by Derek Clifford as "a genuine business-like farm, operating for profit as a farm... ornamented and equipped in such a way as to fulfil the function of a garden." (Note: Derek Clifford is critical of the ferme ornée style, writing that the fusion between farm and garden was "impossibly impractical". He continues: "Either the decorative element, the province of the gardener, would be sacrificed to hard agricultural necessity or the farm would not pay.") David Watkin, an architectural historian, writes of Woburn Farm that "Visitors were confronted with cattle, sheep and poultry to emphasise the modest pastoral charms of rural life." Richard Pococke, the clergyman and writer, described Painshill in 1754 as a "most beautiful farm improvement", and Hamilton's park shares some similarities with Woburn Farm, including its circuit, its indirect paths and the fact that it could not be seen in its entirety from a single viewpoint.

== In art and in popular culture ==
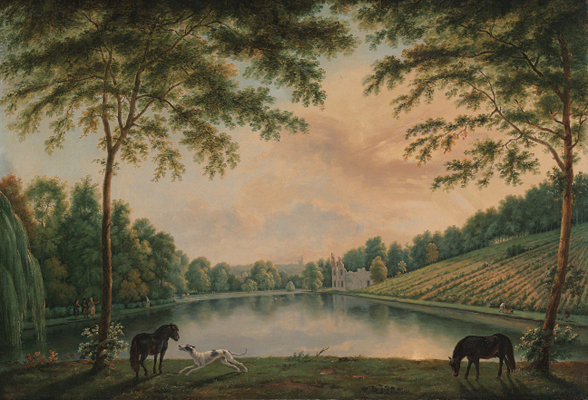
George Barret Sr. and Sawrey Gilpin, A view of Lord Hamilton's Landscape Garden at Painshill, Surrey, from the East end of the Lake with the Vineyard and Ruined Abbey. Oil on canvas.

Several artists visited Painshill in the 18th century to draw and paint the garden. In the 1760s, William Woollett produced the engraving of the bridge that is now named after him, although the image may have been based on a sketch produced a few years before. Prints were distributed as part of a set, all by Woollett, entitled Six delightful Views of elegant Gardens. The popularity of the engraving meant that unauthorised copies and inferior reproductions were made, one of which appeared as a mirror image of the original in a collection of views of "jardins anglo-chinois" published by Georges-Louis Le Rouge in Paris in the 1770s and early 1780s. Woollett's engraving of the bridge is one of three images to appear on the Frog Service produced for Catherine the Great in 1773–74.

Other British artists to depict Painshill include George Barret Sr. and Sawrey Gilpin, who collaborated on an undated oil painting of the eastern end of the lake that shows the Vineyard and the Ruined Abbey. A view across the western side of the lake, showing the Grotto and the Gothic Temple before 1773, is also attributed to Barret. An oil painting of the Temple of Bacchus, dated to the 1760s, is attributed to William Hannan who produced a series of landscapes of English country estates in the mid-18th century. William Gilpin visited Painshill twice, in 1765 and 1772, on the latter occasion producing a sketchbook, which is at the Surrey History Centre, Woking. A portrait of Benjamin Bond Hopkins at Painshill, by Francis Wheatley and exhibited at the Royal Academy in London in 1791, is at the Fitzwilliam Museum, Cambridge.

Fredrik Magnus Piper, View of the interior of the cave at Painshill. 1779. Drawing. Nationalmuseum, Stockholm.

International artists visiting the park included Elias Martin, an engraver and landscape painter from Stockholm, who produced three sketches of views at Painshill in around 1770, two of which were exhibited at the Royal Academy in 1777. A sketchbook by François-Joseph Bélanger, a French architect working in the Neoclassical style, contains several images of Painshill, and may have been produced over a series of visits starting in the late 1760s. Henri Roland Lancelot Turpin de Crissé, a French aristocrat who fled the Reign of Terror in 1793, produced eight drawings of Painshill before leaving England for Philadelphia in 1794. Fredrik Magnus Piper, the designer of Hagaparken, a royal landscape park in Stockholm that also contains numerous follies, visited in 1779, producing a series of sketches.

Painshill has been used as a filming location for several television series, including The Adventures of Robin Hood, Vanity Fair, Black Mirror, Good Omens and Bridgerton. The park was used as a substitute for Hampstead Heath in Dorian Gray, released in 2009, and was used to film scenes for Suffragette, released in 2015.

== Sources ==
=== Books ===
- Adams, John (1961). Butterfield, Lyman Henry; Garrett, Wendell D.; Faber, Leonard C. (eds.). Diary and Autobiography of John Adams. Vol. 3: Diary 1782-1804, Autobiography. P. 1, To October 1776. New York: Atheneum. OCLC 749652670.
- Arnold, Matthew (1895). Russell, George W. E. (ed.). Letters of Matthew Arnold 1848–1888. Vol. II. London: Macmillan. OCLC 1247643292.
- Aslet, Clive (2021). The Story of the Country House. New Haven: Yale University Press. ISBN 978-0-30-025505-8.
- Avcioğlu, Nebahat (2011). Turquerie and the Politics of Representation, 1728–1876. Farnham: Ashgate. ISBN 978-0-75-466422-2.
- Barry, Edward (1775). Observations Historical, Medical and Critical on the Wines of the Ancients. London: T. Cadell. OCLC 659123401.
- Bowls, Elizabeth; Sullivan, Chip (2010). Illustrated History of Landscape Design. Hoboken: John Wiley and Sons. ISBN 978-0-47-028933-4.
- Brown, David; Williamson, Tom (2016). Lancelot Brown and the Capability Men. London: Reaktion Books. ISBN 978-1-78-023644-5.
- Charles-Edwards, Thomas; Reid, Julian (2017). Corpus Christi College, Oxford: A History. Oxford: Oxford University Press. ISBN 978-0-1987-9247-5.
- Clark, H. F. (1980) [1948]. The English Landscape Garden (2nd ed.). Gloucester: Alan Sutton. ISBN 978-0-90-438738-4.
- Clifford, Derek P. (1966) [1962]. A History of Garden Design (2nd ed.). London: Faber and Faber. OCLC 5368129.
- Deitz, Paula (2011). Of Gardens. Penn Studies in Landscape Architecture. Philadelphia: University of Pennsylvania Press. ISBN 978-0-81-224266-9.
- Di Palma, Vittoria (2015). "Is Landscape Painting?". In Doherty, Gareth; Waldheim, Charles (eds.). Is Landscape...? Essays on the Identity of Landscape. Abingdon: Routledge. ISBN 978-1-13-801844-0.
- Dutton, Ralph (1950) [1937]. The English Garden. London: B. T. Batsford. OCLC 1654216.
- Edwards, Ambra (2018). The Story of the English Garden. London: Pavilion Books. ISBN 978-1-91-135825-1.
- Gabler, James M. (1995). Passions: The Wines and Travels of Thomas Jefferson. Baltimore: Bacchus Press. ISBN 978-0-96-135253-0.
- Gover, J. E. B.; Mawer, A.; Stenton, F. M. (1969) [1934]. The Place-names of Surrey. Cambridge: Cambridge University Press. OCLC 18711332.
- Gilpin, William (1802) [1768]. An Essay on Prints (5th ed.). London: T. Cadell Jun. and W. Davies. OCLC 560942103.
- Harris, John (1979). The Artist and the Country House. London: Sotheby Parke Bernet. ISBN 978-0-85-667053-4.
- Holden, Robert; Liversedge, Jamie (2011). Construction for Landscape Architecture. Portfolio Skills. London: Laurence King Publishing. ISBN 978-1-85-669708-8.
- Houston, Adrian; Sainsbury-Plaice, Charles (2023). The Queen's Green Canopy: Ancient Woodlands and Trees. London: Ebury Press. ISBN 978-1-52-990910-4.
- Howes, Lesley (1991). "7: Archaeology as an Aid to Restoration at Painshill Park, Surrey". In Brown, A. E. (ed.). Garden Archaeology (PDF). CBA Research Reports. Vol. 78. London: Council for British Archaeology. ISBN 978-1-87-241417-1.
- Hunt, John Dixon (2012). A World of Gardens. London: Reaktion Books. ISBN 978-1-86-189880-7.
- Hussey, Christopher (1967a) [1927]. The Picturesque: Studies in a Point of View (2nd ed.). London: Frank Cass & Company. OCLC 2616734.
- Hussey, Christopher (1967b). English Gardens and Landscapes: 1700–1750. London: Country Life. OCLC 2616591.
- Laird, Mark (1999). The Flowering of the Landscape Garden. Penn Studies in Landscape Architecture. Philadelphia: University of Pennsylvania Press. ISBN 978-0-81-223457-2.
- Lawrence, Sandra (2024). Lost Gardens of the World. London: Frances Lincoln. ISBN 978-0-71-129268-0.
- Loudon, J. C. (1838). Arboretum et Fruticetum Britannicum. Vol. I. London: J. C. Loudon. OCLC 15867748.
- Mackellar Goulty, Sheena (1993). Heritage Gardens: Care, Conservation and Management. London: Routledge. ISBN 978-1-13-815008-9.
- Manning, Owen; Bray, William (1974) [1809]. The History and Antiquities of the County of Surrey. Wakefield: E. P. Publishing. ISBN 978-0-85-409859-0.
- McFetrich, David (2019). An Encyclopaedia of British Bridges. Barnsley: Pen and Sword. ISBN 978-1-52-675295-6.
- O'Brien, Charles; Nairn, Ian; Cherry, Bridget; Pevsner, Nikolaus (2022) [1962]. Surrey. The Buildings of England. London: Yale University Press. ISBN 978-0-30-023478-7.
- Pococke, Richard (1889). Cartwright, James Joel (ed.). The Travels through England of Dr Richard Pocoke. Vol. II. London: Camden Society. OCLC 4326776.
- Price, Uvedale (1842). On the Picturesque (PDF). Edinburgh: Caldwell, Lloyd and Company. OCLC 1198357.
- Richards, Annette (2001). The Free Fantasia and the Musical Picturesque. Cambridge: Cambridge University Press. ISBN 978-0-52-164077-0.
- Richardson, Tim (2024). The English Landscape Garden: Dreaming of Arcadia. London: Frances Lincoln. ISBN 978-0-71-129092-1.
- Roberts, William (1910). F. Wheatley, R. A., His Life and Works, with a Catalogue of his Engraved Pictures. London: Otto Ltd. OCLC 2736450.
- Ross, Stephanie (1998). What Gardens Mean. Chicago: University of Chicago Press. ISBN 978-0-22-672822-3.
- Sirén, Osvald (1950). China and Gardens of Europe of the Eighteenth Century. New York: Ronald Press. OCLC 258423327.
- Spence, Joseph (1966) [1752]. Osborn, James M. (ed.). Observations, Anecdotes and Characters of Books and Men. Vol. I. Oxford: Clarendon Press. OCLC 1101320481.
- Stroud, Dorothy N. (1986). "The Eighteenth Century: Development of the English Style". In Jellicoe, Geoffrey; Jellicoe, Susan; Goode, Patrick; Lancaster, Michael (eds.). The Oxford Companion to Gardens. Oxford: Oxford University Press. ISBN 978-0-19-866123-8.
- Symes, Michael (2010a). Mr Hamilton's Elysium: The Gardens of Painshill. London: Frances Lincoln. ISBN 978-0-71-123055-2.
- Taylor, David C. (2003). Cobham: A History. Chichester: Phillimore. p. 55. ISBN 978-1-86-077247-4.
- Taylor, David C. (2006). An Estate for All Seasons : A History of Cobham Park, Surrey and its Owners and Occupiers. Chichester: Phillimore. ISBN 978-1-86-077431-7.
- Thacker, Christopher (2002). Building Towers, Forming Gardens: Landscaping by Hamilton, Hoare and Beckford. London: St Barnabus Press. ISBN 978-0-95-082132-0.
- Turner, Roger (1999) [1985]. Capability Brown and the Eighteenth-Century English Landscape (2nd ed.). Chichester: Phillimore. ISBN 978-1-86-077114-9.
- Walpole, Horace (1903). Toynbee, Helen Wrigley (ed.). The Letters of Horace Walpole, Fourth Earl of Orford. Vol. II. Oxford: Clarendon Press.
- Walpole, Horace (1995) [1780]. The History of the Modern Taste in Gardening. New York: Ursus Press. ISBN 978-1-88-314502-6.
- Watkin, David (1982). The English Vision: The Picturesque in Architecture, Landscape and Garden Design. London: John Murray. ISBN 978-0-71-953972-5.
- Whaley, Joachim (2012). Germany and the Holy Roman Empire. Vol. II: From the Peace of Westphalia to the Dissolution of the Reich, 1648–1806. Oxford: Oxford University Press. ISBN 978-0-19-969307-8.
- Whately, Thomas (1770). Observations on Modern Gardening. London: Thomas Payne. OCLC 642320401.
- Wulf, Andrea (2008). The Brother Gardeners. London: William Heineman. ISBN 978-0-43-401612-9.
- Yee, Ronald (2021). The Architecture of British Bridges. Marlborough: Crowood Press. ISBN 978-1-78-500795-8.
- Young, Arthur (1768). A Six Weeks Tour, Through the Southern Counties of England and Wales. London: W. Nicoll.
- Sayer and Bennett's Enlarged Catalogue of New and Valuable Prints. London: Robert Sayer and John Bennett. 1775. OCLC 989023883.

=== Journals ===
- Batey, Mavis (2010). "Paradise Regained". New Arcadian Journal (67/68): 15–21.
- Burford, Janie (2010). "From Dereliction to Reconstruction". New Arcadian Journal (67/68): 59–63.
- Clark, Jan (2013). "An Amateur Artist's Sketching Tour of Late Eighteenth Century English Gardens". Garden History. 41 (2): 209–223. JSTOR 24636229.
- Clifford, Timothy (1992). "The Plaster Shops of the Rococo and Neo-classical Era in Britain". Journal of the History of Collections. 4 (1): 39–65. doi:10.1093/jhc/4.1.39.
- Collier, Mavis; Wrightson, David (1993). "The Recreation of the Turkish Tent at Painshill". Garden History. 21 (1): 46–59. doi:10.2307/1587053. JSTOR 1587053.
- Feluś, Kate (2010). "Charles Hamilton's Buildings: Speculation on the Social Use of Painshill Park". New Arcadian Journal (67/68): 41–49.
- Jeffery, Sally (2013). "The Temple of Bacchus at Painshill Park: A Note on its Style and Precedents". Garden History. 41 (1): 135–141. JSTOR 24636008.
- Laird, Mark (2010). "The Future of Garden Restoration". New Arcadian Journal (67/68): 79–86.
- Martin, Claude (1971). "David Geneste – A Huguenot Vine Grower at Cobham". Surrey Archaeological Collections. 68: 153–160. doi:10.5284/1069001.
- O'Brien, Teige H. P. (1991). "Painshill: The Restoration of an Eighteenth-Century Park and Garden". Professional Horticulture. 5 (3): 122–128. JSTOR 45121209.
- Sisa, Jȯzsef (1994). "Count Ferenc Széchényi's Visit to English Parks and Gardens in 1787". Garden History. 22 (1): 64–71. doi:10.2307/1587002. JSTOR 1587002.
- Symes, Michael (2010b). "Georgian Painshill". New Arcadian Journal (67/68): 23–40.
- Toynbee, Paget (1927–1928). "Horace Walpole's Journals of Visits to Country Seats, &c". The Volume of the Walpole Society. 16: 36–37. JSTOR 41830706.
- Walker, T. E. C. (1965). "The Chase of Hampton Court" (PDF). Surrey Archaeological Collections. 62: 83–87. doi:10.5284/1068947.
- Woodbridge, Kenneth (1982). "Bélanger en Angleterre: Son Carnet de Voyage". Architectural History. 25: 8–19, 138–150. doi:10.2307/1568407. JSTOR 1568407.

=== Magazines ===
- Cornforth, John (18 July 1963). "A Varied Vision of Georgian Life". Country Life. Vol. CXXXIV, no. 3463. pp. 169–170.
- Dennison, Matthew (6 May 2020). "A Londoner who Immortalised Georgian Life". Country Life. Vol. CCXIV, no. 19. pp. 90–91.
- Lerwill, Ben (9 July 2025). "Back to Brideshead". Country Life. Vol. CCXXV, no. 28. pp. 78–85.
- Musson, Jeremy (22 October 1998). "Is Building a Good Cause?". Country Life. Vol. CXCII, no. 43. pp. 94–97.
- Nares, Gordon (2 January 1958a). "Painshill, Surrey I". Country Life. Vol. CXXIII, no. 3181. pp. 18–21.
- Nares, Gordon (9 January 1958b). "Painshill, Surrey II". Country Life. Vol. CXXIII, no. 3182. pp. 62–65.
- Plumptre, George (16 November 2016). "In the Heat of the Night". Country Life. Vol. CCX, no. 46. pp. 48–52.
- Richardson, Tim (4 January 2001). "Painshill Surrey". Country Life. Vol. CXCV, no. 1. pp. 28–35.
- Winter, Gordon (12 March 1981). "Restoring a Great Landscape Garden". Country Life. Vol. CLXX, no. 4360. pp. 638–640.
- Worsley, Giles (11 September 1986). "A Garden Reappears". Country Life. Vol. CLXXX, no. 4647. pp. 802–805.
