= Virgin and Child Enthroned (Romas) =

Painting by Spiridione Roma

- Παναγία Βρεφοκρατούσα Ένθρονη (Greek), Madonna col Bambino in Trono (Italian)
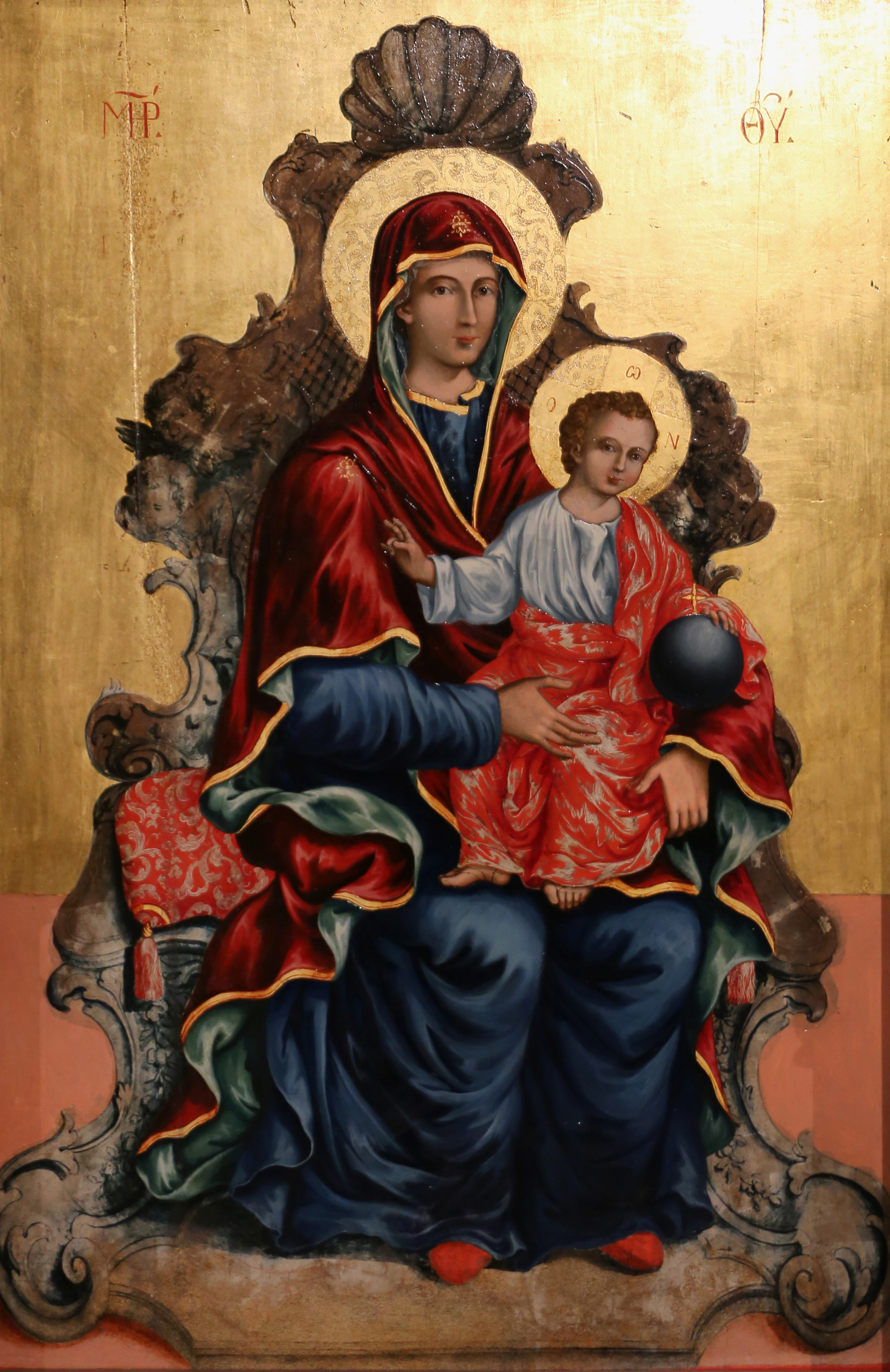
- Artist: Spiridione Roma
- Year: 1764
- Medium: tempera on wood
- Movement: Heptanese School
- Subject: Virgin and Child Enthroned
- Dimensions: 117.5 cm × 78.5 cm (46.3 in × 30.9 in)
- Location: Museo della Città di Livorno (Museum of the City of Livorno), Livorno, Italy
- Owner: Museo della Città di Livorno
- Accession: 1277

The Virgin and Child Enthroned is a tempera painting created by Spyridon Romas. He was a Greek painter from the island of Corfu and a prominent member of the Heptanese School active from 1745 to 1786 in Corfu, Lecce, Livorno, and London. Twenty-five of his works survived according to research completed by the Hellenic Institute. One of few Greek painters that changed his style completely Romas transitioned from the Heptanese School to the British style of painting. He traveled to London, England around 1770, and remained in the country until his death. Romas painted several portraits but also maintained art. An important iconostasis containing most of his works is preserved in Livorno, Italy at the Museo della Città di Livorno (Museum of the City of Livorno).

The Virgin and Child enthroned was an important theme painted by both Italian and Greek Byzantine painters. Cretan Renaissance painters and Greek Baroque painters depicted the sacred figures in their works. Important works were completed by Andreas Ritzos and Georgios Klontzas namely The Virgin Pantanassa. The painting style slowly evolved with Emmanuel Tzanes and his brother Konstantinos Tzanes both artists refined the Cretan School and brought the theme into the Heptanese School. One example is Lady the Lambovitissa. Spyridon adopted the technique prevalent on the Ionian Islands in the middle of the 1700s further refining the painting technique. The painting method was in demand in different Greek churches in Italy namely the church of the Holy Trinity in Livorno and the Chiesa Greco-Ortodossa di San Nicola in Lecce, Sicily. The current painting is in Livorno, Italy at the Museo della Città di Livorno (Museum of the City of Livorno).

== Description ==
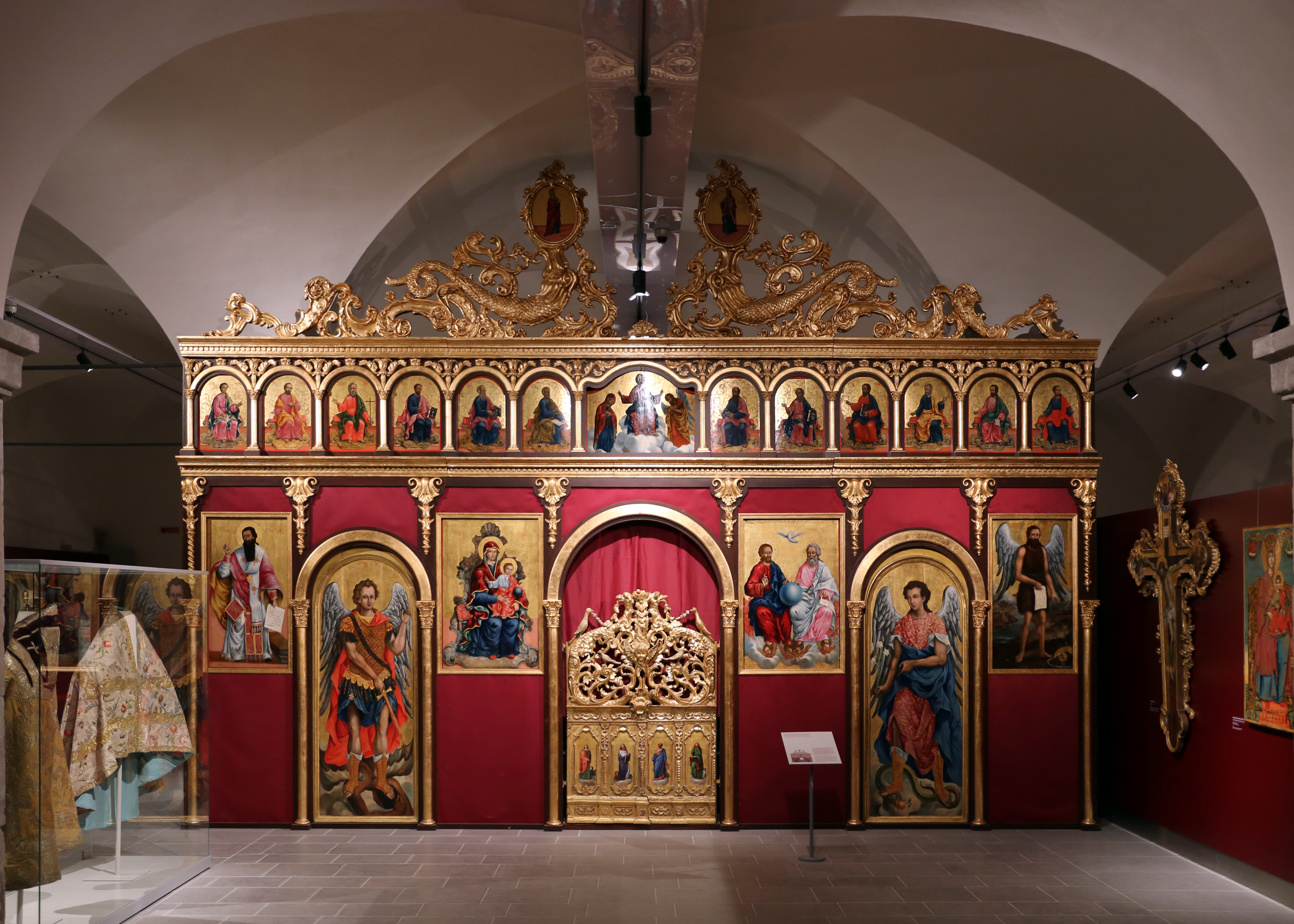
Iconostasis

The work of art was completed in 1764 for the Trinity Greek Orthodox Church in Livorno, Italy. It is part of a well-preserved iconostasis. The painting was completed using gold leaf, wood panel, and tempera paint. The height is 117.5 cm (46.3 in.) and the width is 78.5 cm (30.9 in.) nearly the same size as The Holy Trinity completed by Romas for the same church. In 1942, the church was torn down because of a city rehabilitation project, and the works of art were restored and moved to a museum. The icon is an epic depiction of the craftsmanship of the Heptanese School. The celestial heavenly throne features a shell-like decoration common to the works of Filippo Lippi and Emmanuel Tzanes. The Lady the Lambovitissa features the complex geometric structure. The throne follows the lines of the rococo style and is elaborately decorated with angels. The Virgins robe features gold trim, floating ripples, folds of fabric, and striations with delicate contours. The drapery folds are more in line with the painting by Konstantinos Tzanes rather than the traditional Cretan style. The painter uses a brilliant combination of gold, red, blue, and green on her robe. Both figures feature gold halos. The Christ child has curly hair and holds a round sphere with a cross. The sphere with the cross held by the Christ child was a common theme in Cretan Renaissance paintings it symbolized earth as a heavenly dominion. Christ's attire features decorative patterns on his robe and pillow. The facial features of both heavenly beings exhibit complex refined detail exemplary of the anatomy prevalent in paintings of the Heptanese School. Romas implemented a complex shadowing method adding refined realism.

== Gallery ==
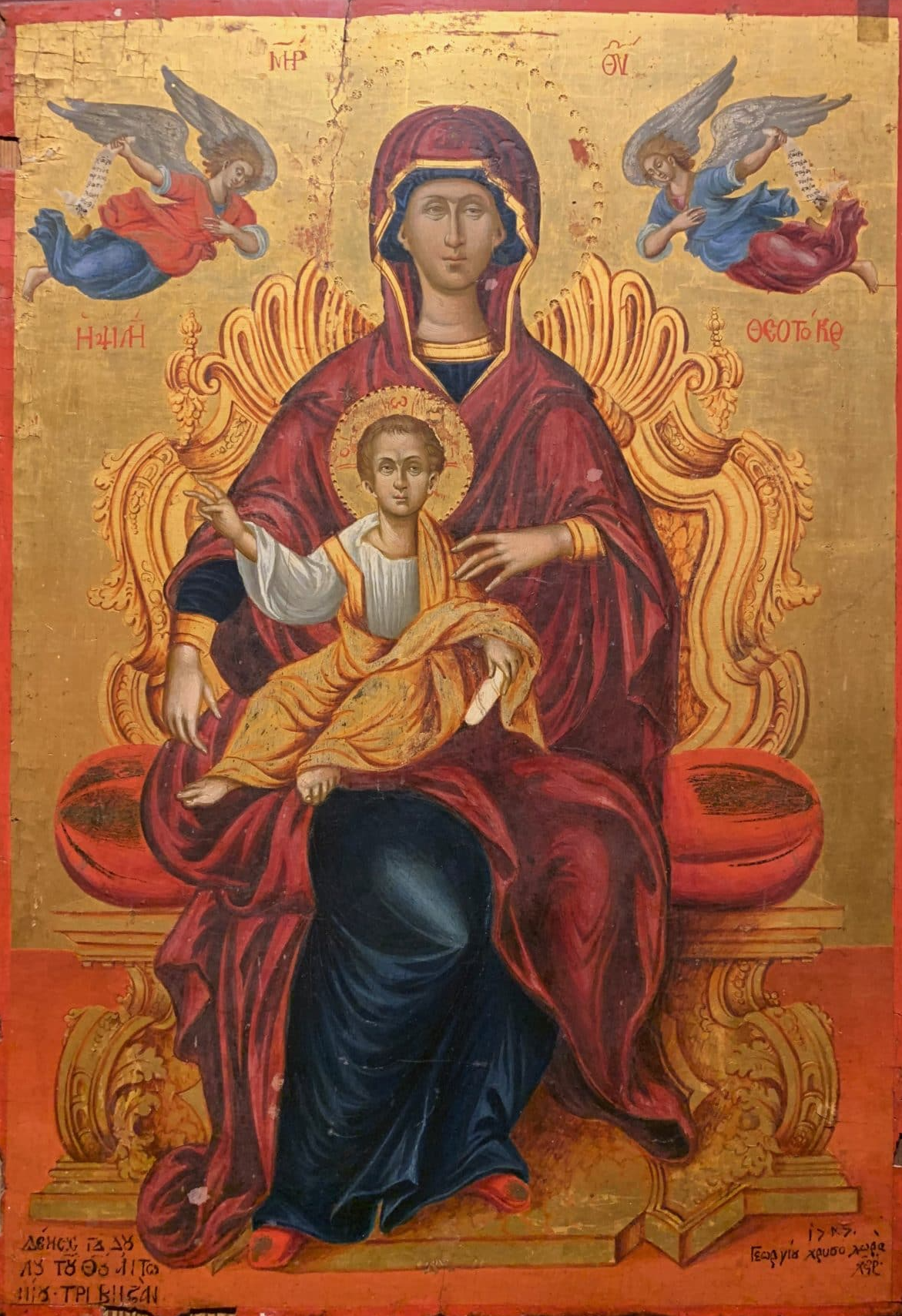
Virgin and Child Enthroned by Georgios Chrysoloras

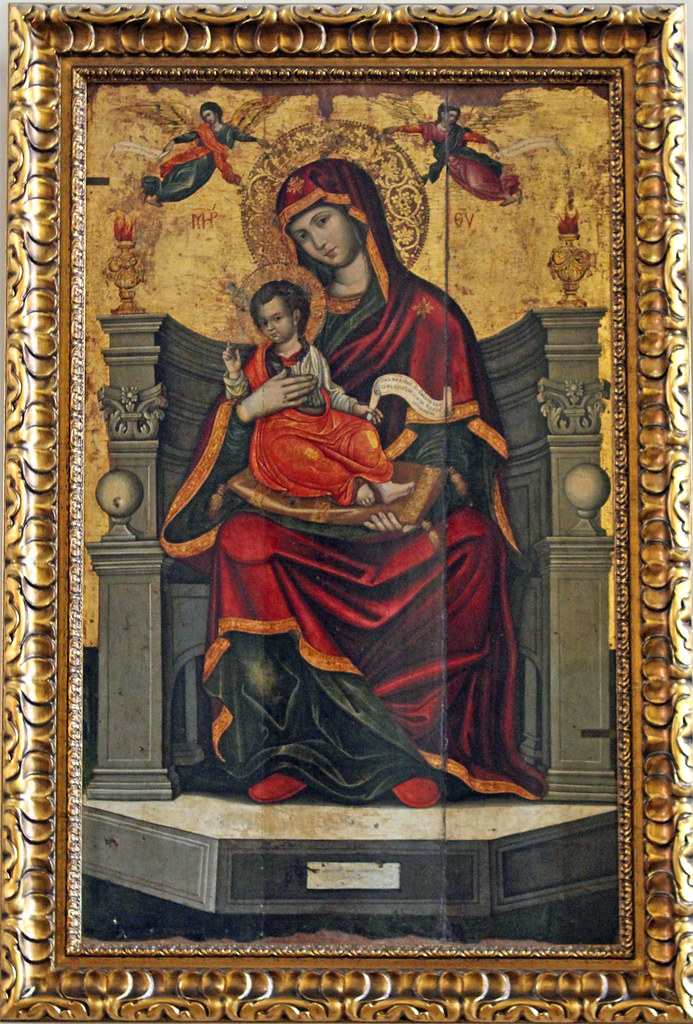
Virgin and Child Enthroned Konstantinos

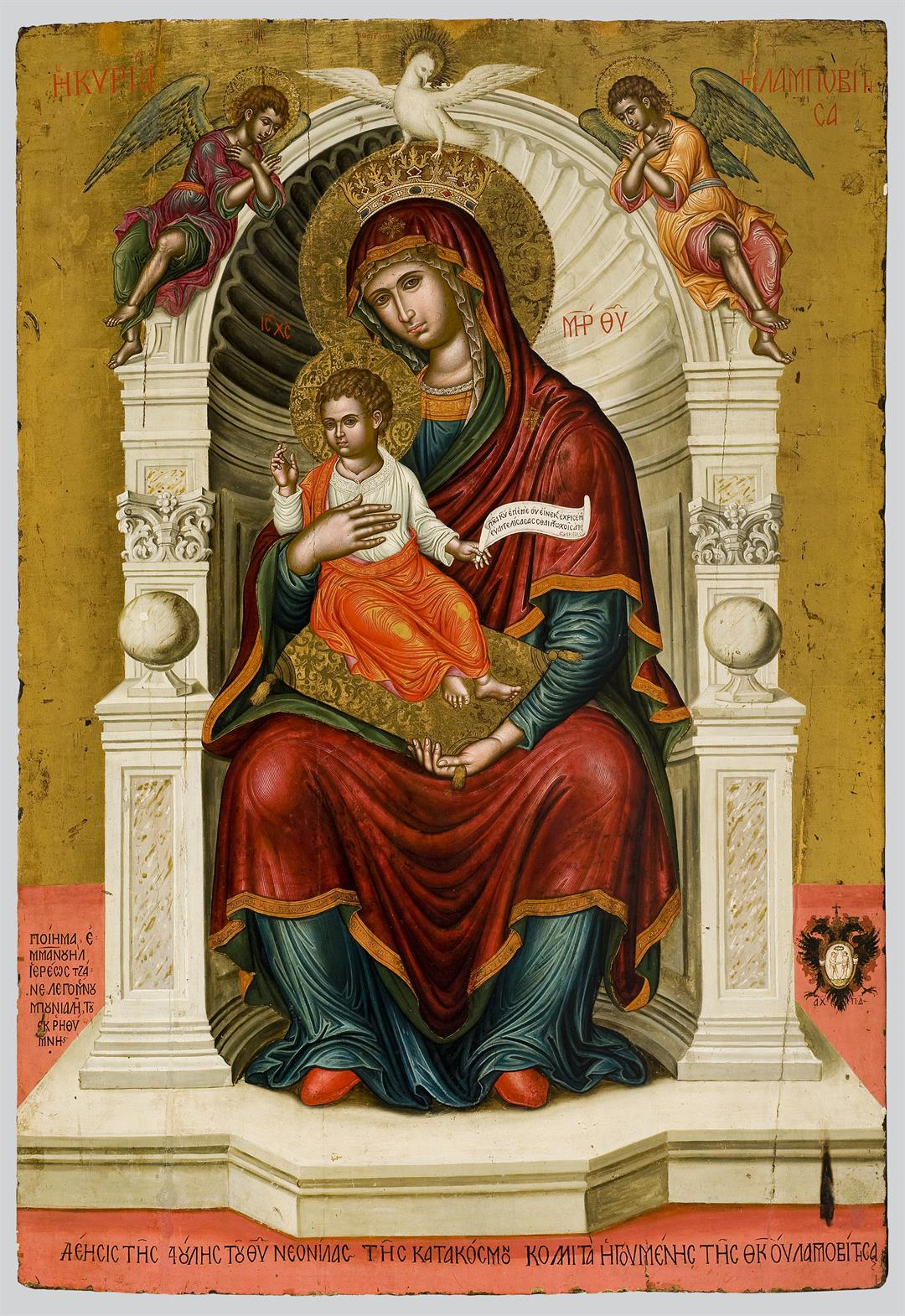
Lady the Lambovitissa

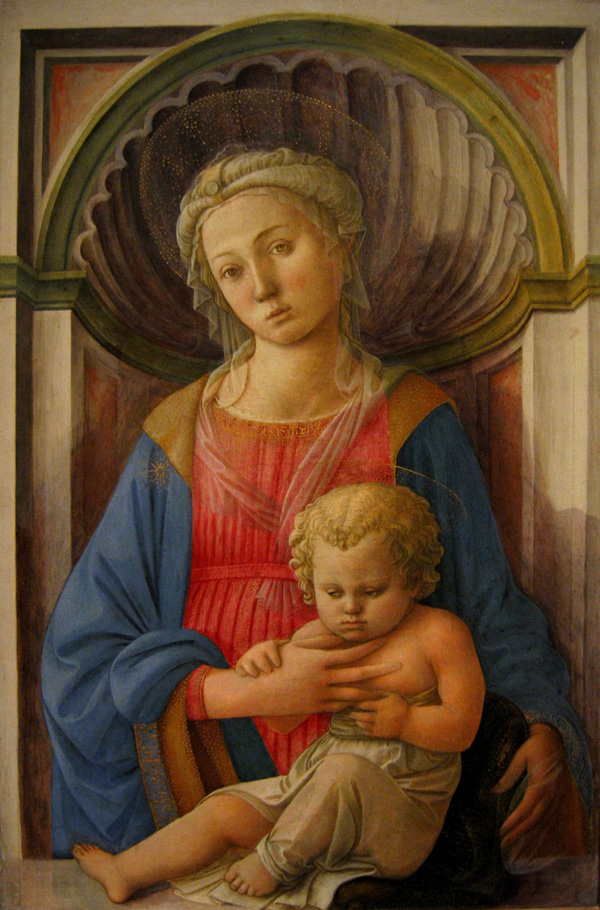
Virgin and Child inside niche Filippo Lippi

=== Traditional ===
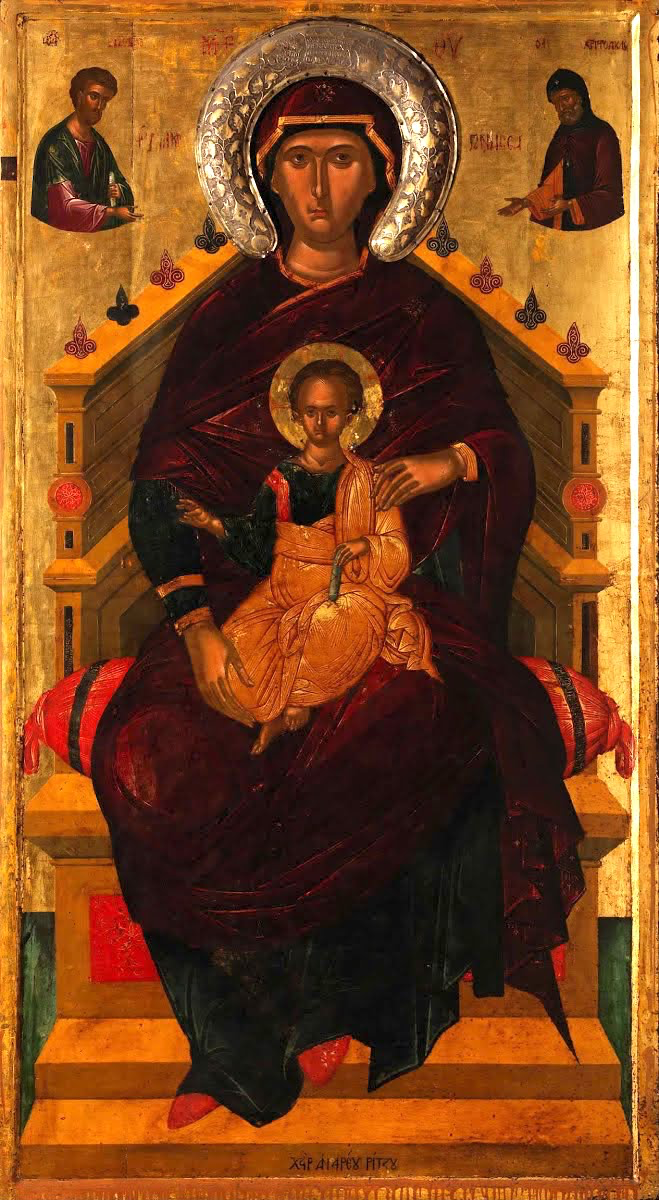
The Virgin Pantanassa Ritzos

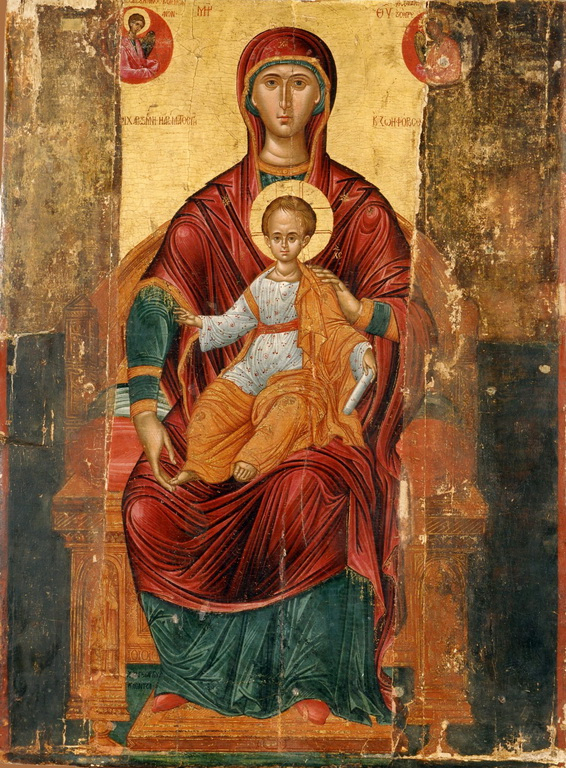
Virgin and Child Enthroned Klontzas

== Bibliography ==
- Hatzidakis, Manolis; Drakopoulou, Evgenia (1997). Έλληνες Ζωγράφοι μετά την Άλωση (1450-1830). Τόμος 2: Καβαλλάρος - Ψαθόπουλος [Greek Painters after the Fall of Constantinople (1450-1830). Volume 2: Kavallaros - Psathopoulos]. Athens: Center for Modern Greek Studies, National Research Foundation. hdl:10442/14088. ISBN 960-7916-00-X.
- Passarelli, Gaetano (2001). Le Iconostasi e le Ιcone di Livorno [The Iconostasis and Icons of Livorno] (PDF). Pisa, Italy: Le Industrie Grafiche of Pacini Editore S.P.A. p. 168. Archived (PDF) from the original on July 1, 2022.
- Voulgaropoulou, Margarita (2018). "Cross-Cultural Encounters in the Twilight of the Republic of Venice: The Church of the Dormition of the Virgin in Višnjeva, Montenegro" (PDF). Journal of Modern Greek Studies. 36 (1). Baltimore, Maryland: Johns Hopkins University Press: 25–69. doi:10.1353/mgs.2018.0001. S2CID 85535270.
