= The East Offering its Riches to Britannia =

1778 painting by Spiridione Roma

- Η Ανατολή Προσφέρει τα Πλούτη της στη Βρετανία (Greek), L'Oriente Offre le Sue Ricchezze alla Britannia (Italian)
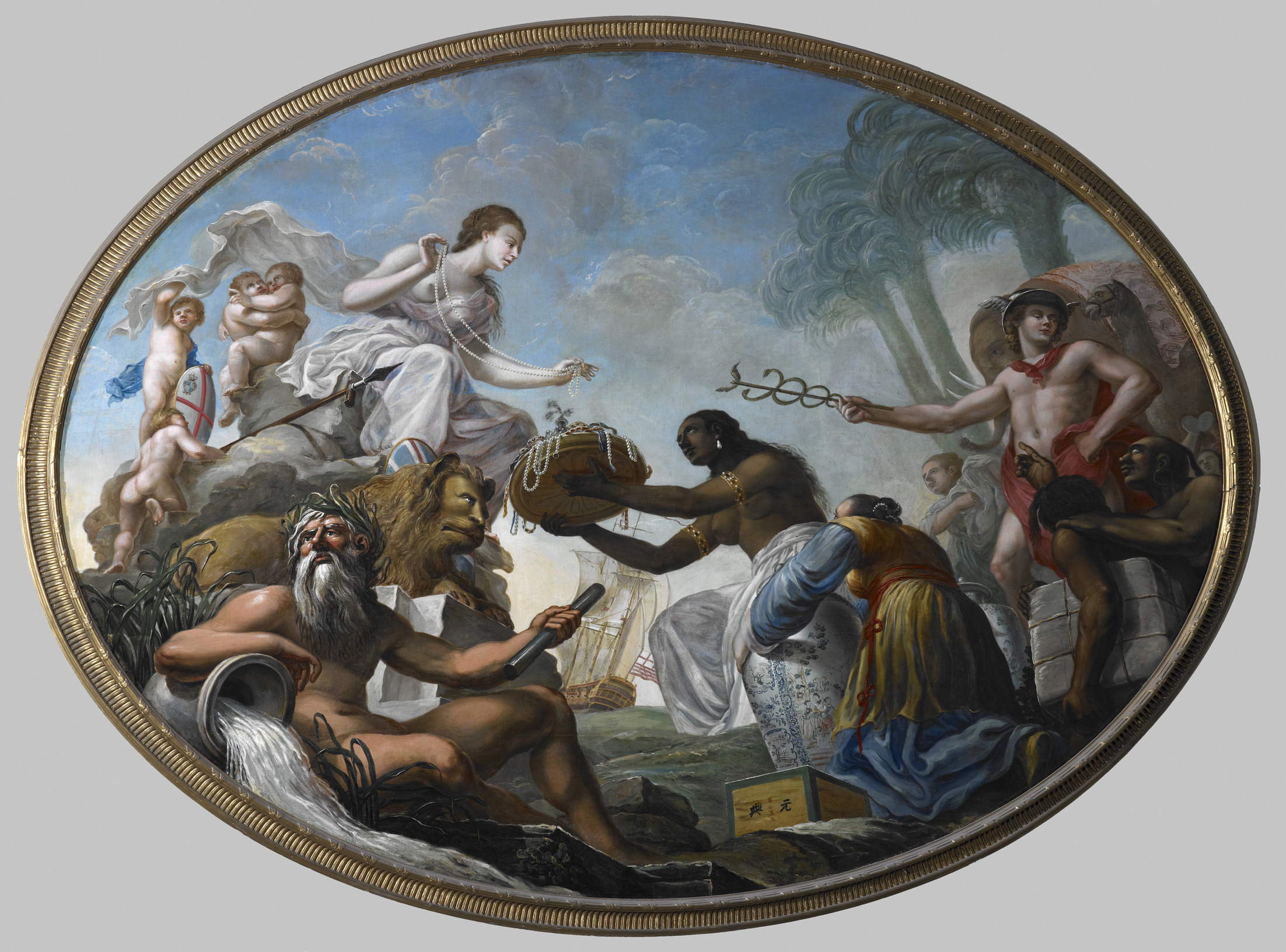
- Artist: Spiridione Roma
- Year: 1778
- Medium: Oil on Canvas
- Movement: British Painting
- Subject: The East Offering its Riches to Britannia
- Dimensions: 228 cm × 305 cm (89.8 in × 120 in)
- Location: British Library, London, England
- Owner: British Library
- Accession: F245

The East Offering its Riches to Britannia is an oil painting by the Greek artist Spyridon Romas (active 1745–1786). Born on the island of Corfu, Romas worked in Corfu, Lecce, Livorno, and London. He trained in the Heptanese School and later adopted an English style. In 1770 he settled in London, where he remained for the rest of his life. About twenty-five of his works survive; although he painted a number of portraits during his years in London, The East Offering its Riches to Britannia is his best-known work.

European colonialism expanded from around 1500 until the mid-20th century. By 1800 European powers controlled roughly 35 percent of the world's land, a figure that rose to about 84 percent by 1914. The British Empire became the largest empire in history; by 1913 it held dominion over some 23 percent of the world's population, or about 412 million people. Commissioned by the East India Company, the painting depicts the company presenting its riches to Britannia and serves as an allegory of British imperial power.

Allegories of colonization were a common subject during this period. The Venetian painter Giovanni Battista Tiepolo produced several such works, including Wealth and Benefits of the Spanish Monarchy under Charles III, an allegory of Spanish colonialism. Dutch colonial power was treated in Pieter Isaacsz's Harpsichord Lid showing an Allegory of Amsterdam as the Centre of World Trade and in Willem de Poorter's Allegory of Colonial Power. Painted in the English neoclassical style, The East Offering its Riches to Britannia originally hung in the Revenue Committee Room of East India House in London. After the building was demolished, its contents passed to the British Library, and the painting now hangs in the Foreign, Commonwealth and Development Office.

== Description ==
The massive work of art is ten feet long with a height of 228 cm (89.7 in) and a width of 305 cm (10 ft). The work was completed in 1778. The painting symbolizes Britons dominance over the world. India, Persia, China, and the Americas are represented. The East India Company is offering its riches to the female warrior Britannia. She is accompanied by four putto, one holds her floating dress and shield while another directly below him holds her sacred trident. The lion symbolized the might of Britannia as she sits on her majestic throne elevated higher than her loyal subjects. Old Father Thames the personification of the river Thames in London pours water at Britannia's feet. A bare breasted dark complexioned kneeling woman representing India offers pearls and jewels to Britannia. Britannia is depicted as a pale white woman accepting her extravagant gifts from India holding pearls in her two hands. Between the two figures, a ship with the flag of the East India Company floats in the distant background.

China is represented by a kneeling woman dressed in gold and blue holding a Chinese vase situated next to a box with symbols. Behind the woman directly below the god Mercury, the Americas are represented by two figures offering cotton. A Persian man appears under the right arm of Mercury carrying silk. Behind the Persian man, an elephant and camel appear. The god Mercury is associated with financial gain and commerce. He points his staff with intertwined snakes at Britannia transferring power to the mighty female warrior while he gazed angrily upon the Americas. At the time of the painting's completion, the American Revolutionary War had already begun. The painting relays an illusion of dramatic subjugation containing rococo and neoclassical elements.

The artist clearly conveys his complete understanding of human anatomy. The Heptanese School began to evolve into a more sophisticated representation of the human subject. Romas clearly matured as an artist spending many years in Italy travelling all over the country and finally settling in London. The artist conveys his understanding of the human nude subject. The playful juxtaposition of bare-breasted pale and dark women relays a message of cultural identity. Romas painted attractive sculpturesque figures and brilliantly employed a complex shadowing technique. The blue sky relays impressionistic characteristics.

== Gallery of similar works ==
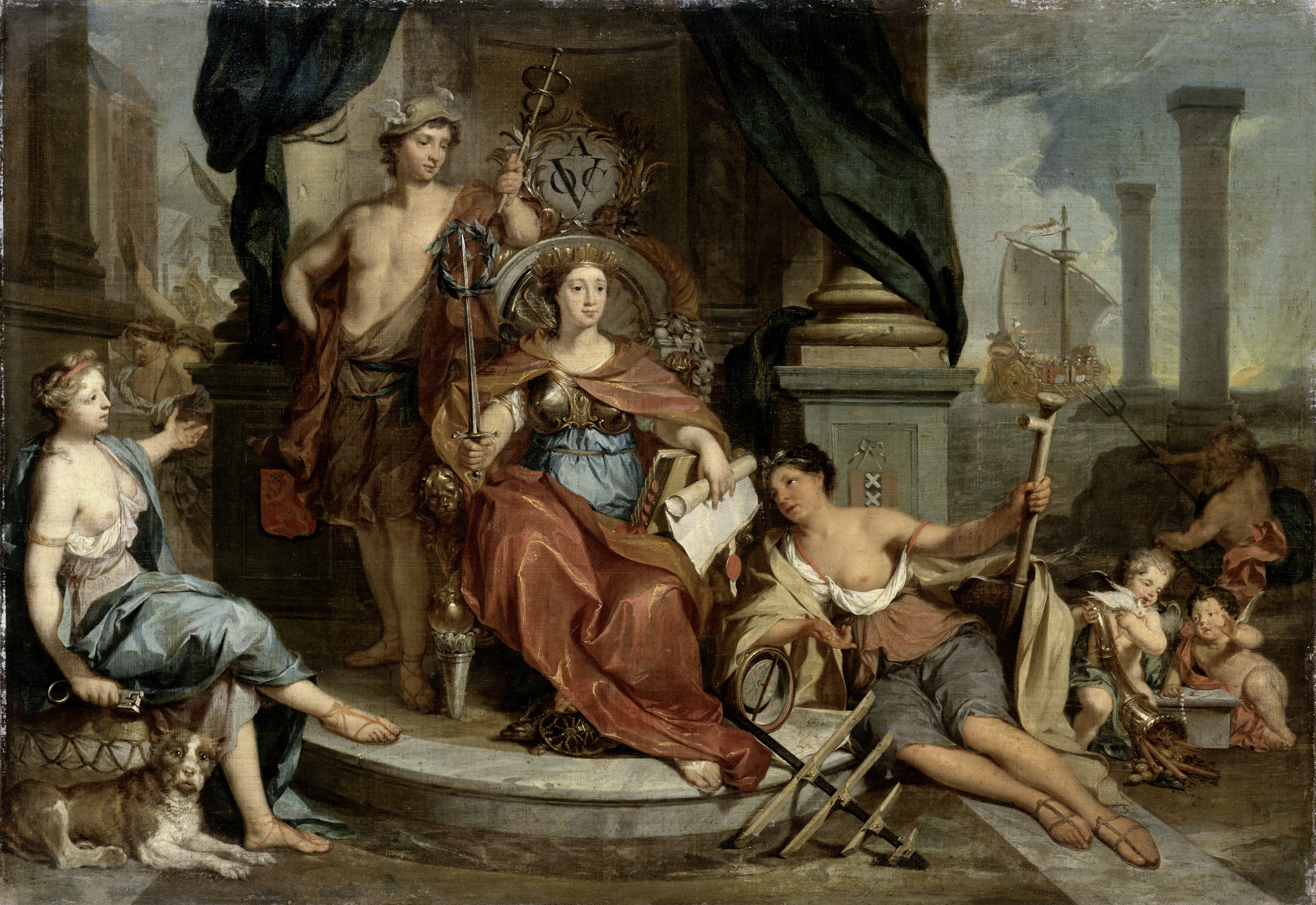
Amsterdam Chamber of the Dutch East India Company

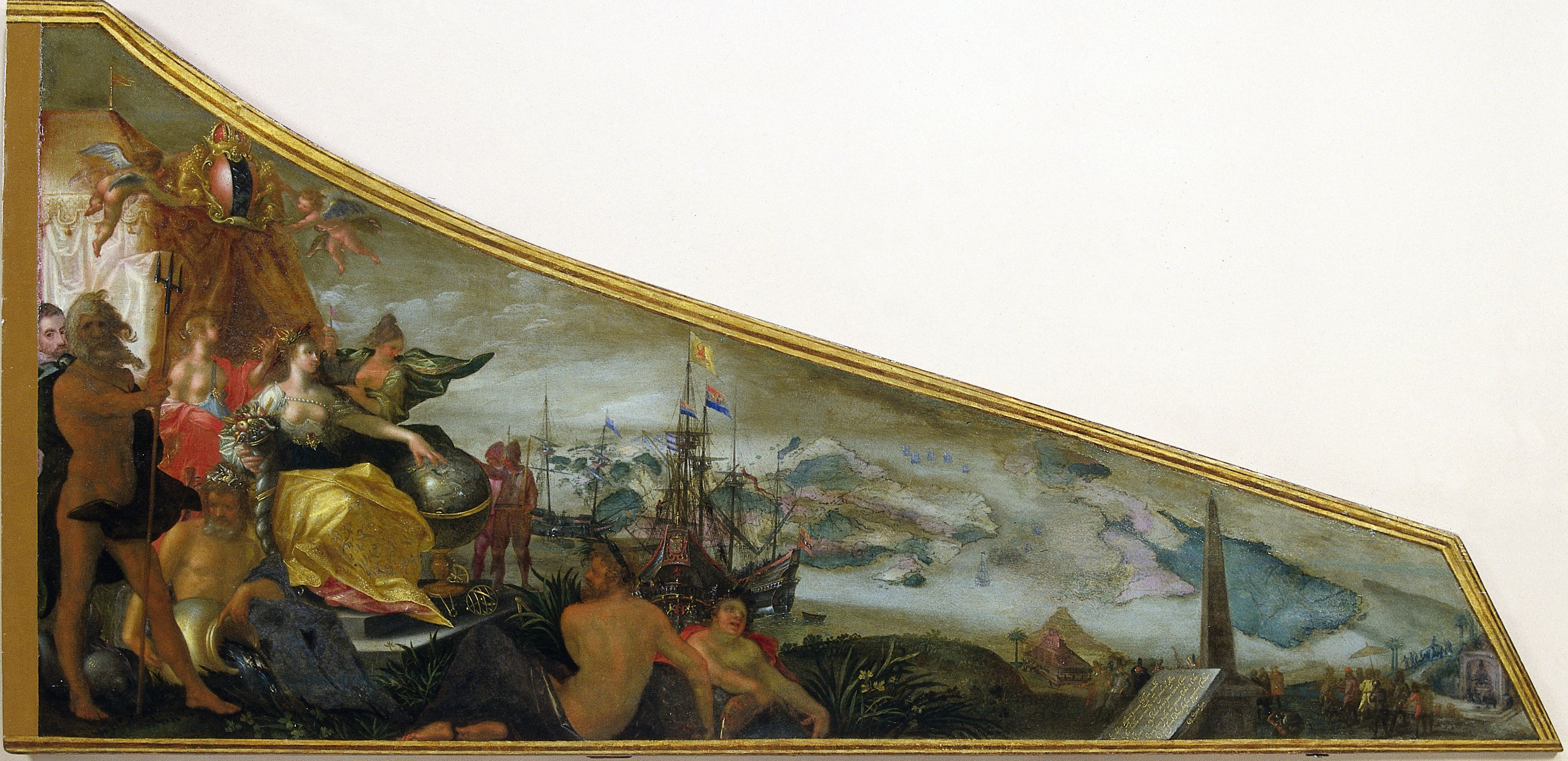
Harpsichord Lid showing an Allegory of Amsterdam as the Centre of World Trade

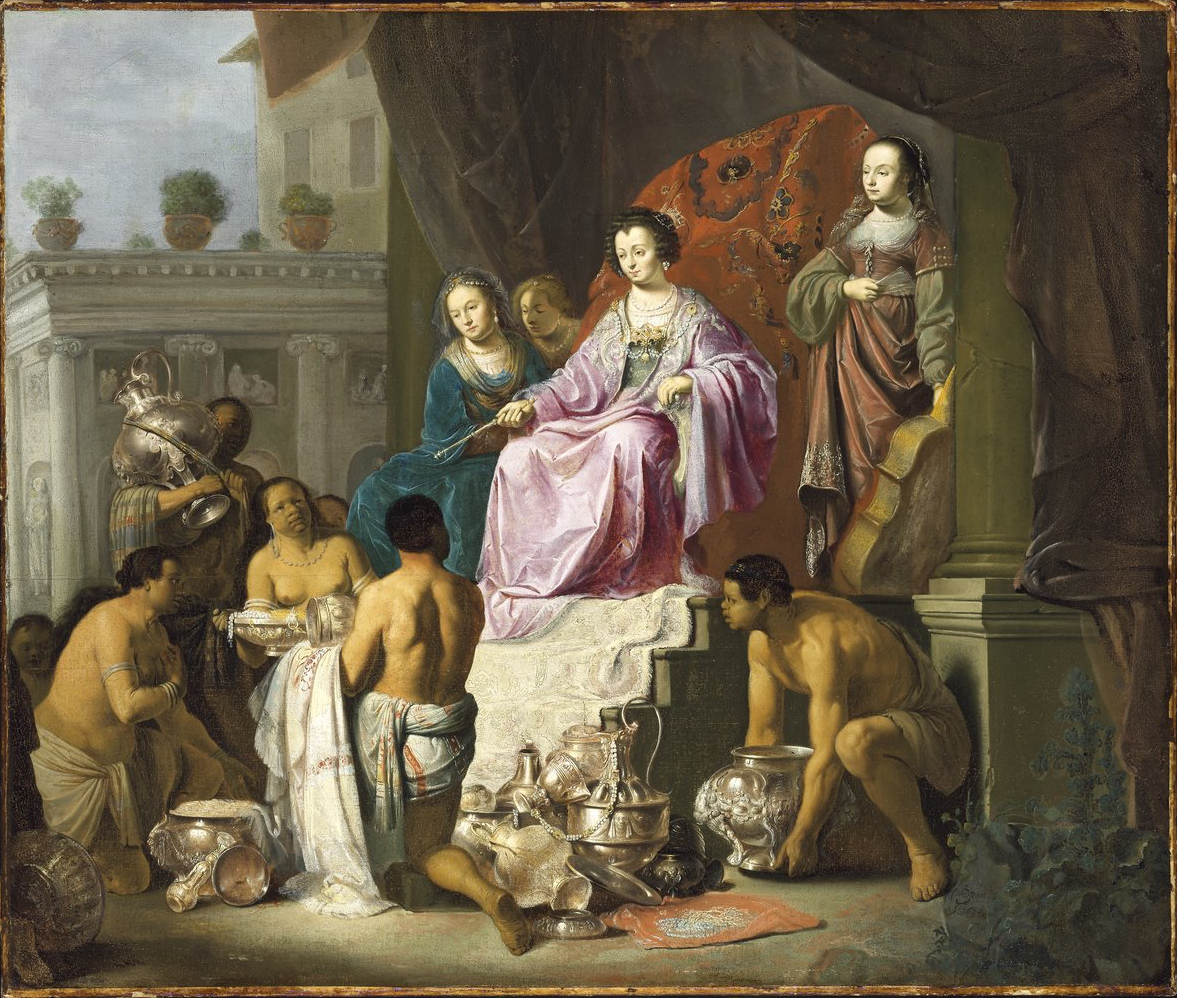
Allegory of Colonial Power by Willem de Poorter

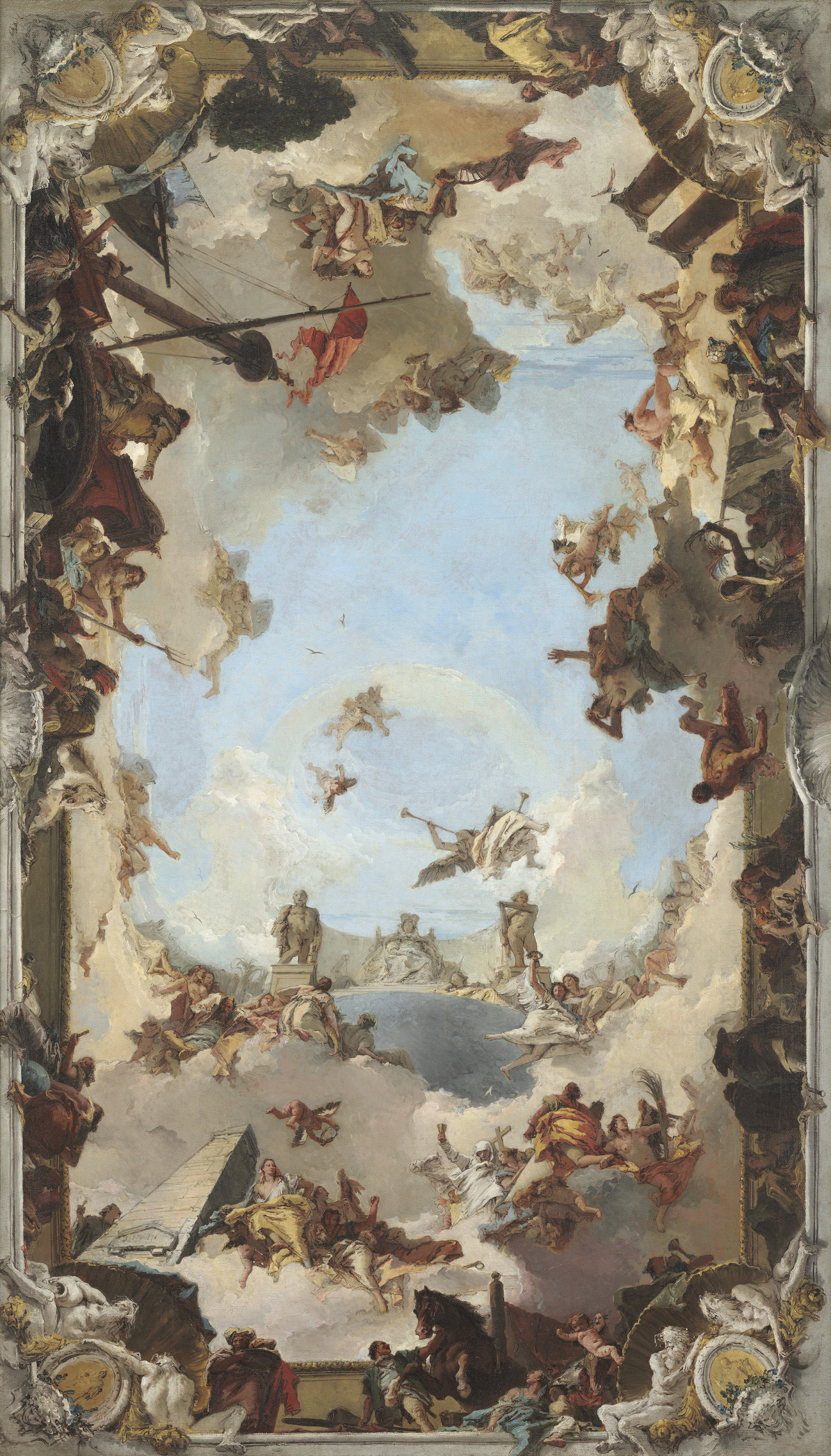
Wealth and Benefits of the Spanish Monarchy under Charles III

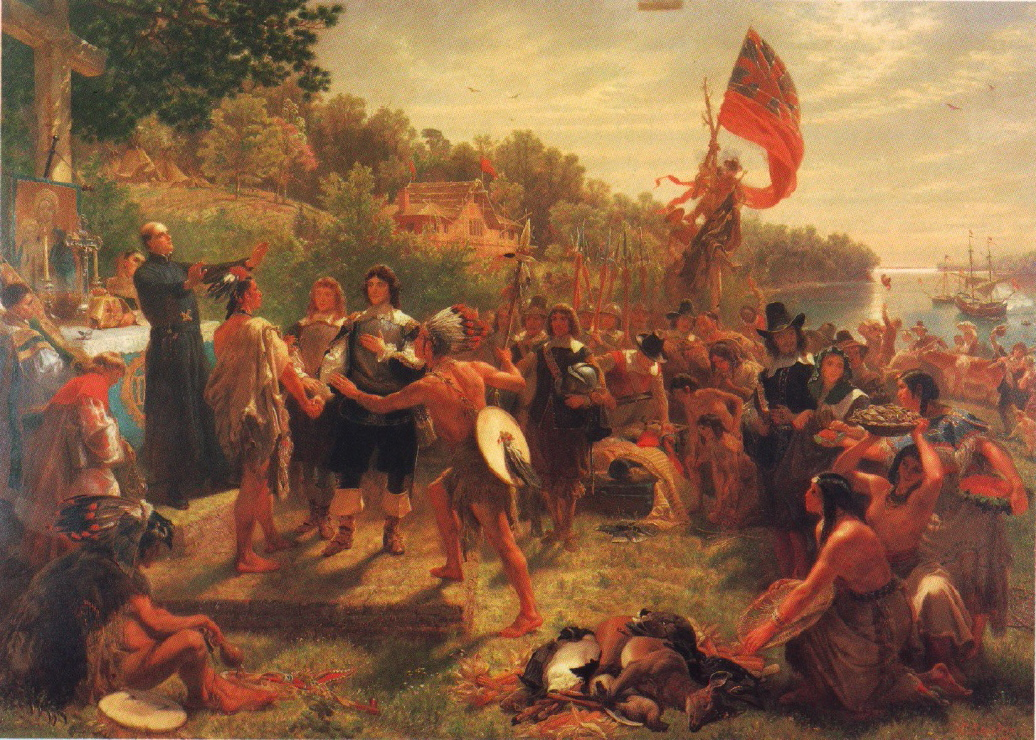
The Founding of Maryland by Emmanuel Leutze, 1860

== Bibliography ==
- Hatzidakis, Manolis; Drakopoulou, Evgenia (1997). Έλληνες Ζωγράφοι μετά την Άλωση (1450–1830). Τόμος 2: Καβαλλάρος – Ψαθόπουλος [Greek Painters after the Fall of Constantinople (1450–1830). Volume 2: Kavallaros – Psathopoulos]. Athens: Centre for Modern Greek Studies, National Research Foundation. hdl:10442/14088. ISBN 960-7916-00-X.
- Voulgaropoulou, Margarita (2018). "Cross-Cultural Encounters in the Twilight of the Republic of Venice: The Church of the Dormition of the Virgin in Višnjeva, Montenegro" (PDF). Journal of Modern Greek Studies. 36 (1). Baltimore, Maryland: Johns Hopkins University Press: 25–69. doi:10.1353/mgs.2018.0001. S2CID 85535270.
- Maddison, Angus (2001). The World Economy: A Millennial Perspective (PDF). Paris, France: Organisation for Economic Co-operation and Development. ISBN 9789264186088. Archived (PDF) from the original on 11 November 2020.
- Hoffman, Philip T. (2015). Why Did Europe Conquer the World?. Princeton, N.J.: Princeton University Press. ISBN 978-1-4008-6584-0.
- Chattopadhyay, Swati (2005). Representing Calcutta Modernity, Nationalism, and the Colonial Uncanny. New York, N.Y.: Routledge. ISBN 9780415343596.
- Groseclose, Barbara S. (1995). British Sculpture and the Company Raj Church Monuments and Public Statuary in Madras, Calcutta, and Bombay to 1858. Newark, DE: University of Delaware Press. ISBN 9780874134063.
- Scheidel, Walter; Bang, Peter Fibiger; Bayly, C.A. (2020). The Oxford World History of Empire Volume One: The Imperial Experience. New York, N.Y.: Oxford University Press. ISBN 9780199773114.
