= The Virgin Pantanassa (Ritzos) =

Painting by Andreas Ritzos

- Η Παντάνασσα (Greek), La Vergine Pantanassa (Italian)
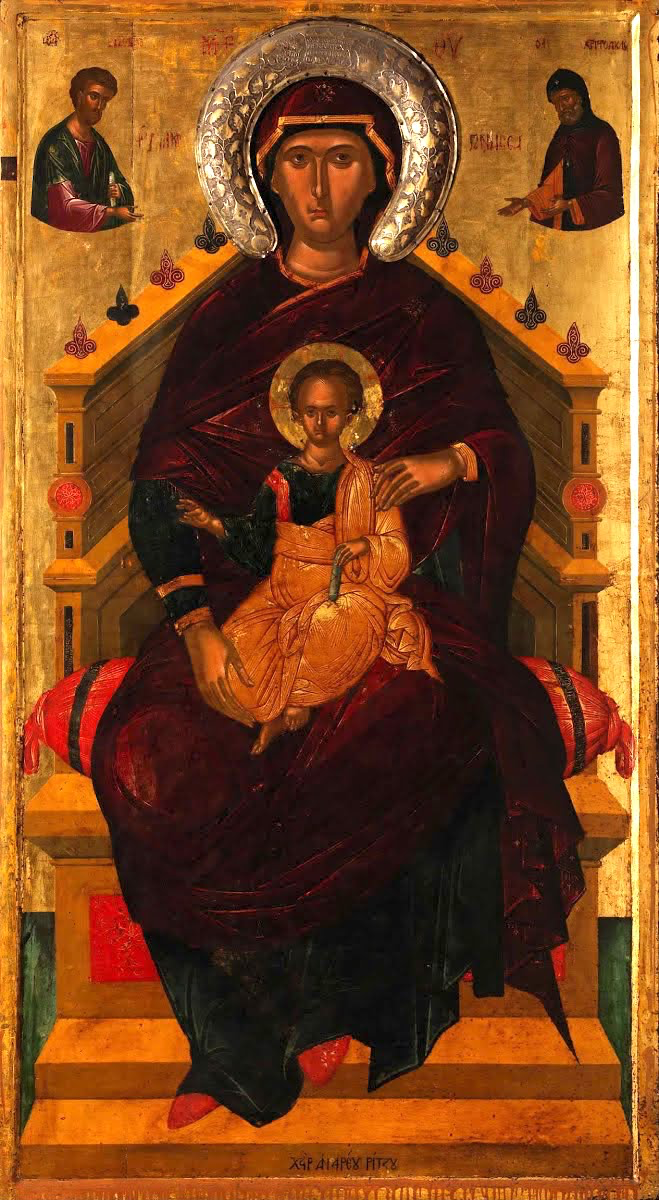
- Artist: Andreas Ritzos
- Year: 1435-1492
- Medium: tempera on wood
- Movement: Cretan School
- Subject: The Virgin and Child enthroned with James the Apostle and Saint Christodoulos of Patmos.
- Dimensions: 164 cm × 92 cm (64.5 in × 36.2 in)
- Location: Monastery of Saint John the Theologian Museum, Patmos, Greece
- Owner: Monastery of Saint John the Theologian, Patmos, Greece

The Virgin Pantanassa is a tempera painting by Andreas Ritzos. Ritzos was a Greek painter active on the island of Crete. He flourished from 1435 to 1492. The painter has an existing catalog of over sixty works attributed to him. He signed his works in both Greek and Latin. He is one of the most influential painters of the Cretan Renaissance. He painted in the traditional Greek-Italian Byzantine style. His work was also heavily influenced by Venetian painting. His teacher was Angelos Akotantos. He was also affiliated with Andreas Pavias. His son was famous Greek painter Nikolaos Ritzos. Ritzo's Italian contemporaries were Paolo Uccello and Fra Angelico. They all painted a mixture of the Greek-Italian Byzantine and Italian Renaissance styles. The art of Crete was heavily influenced by the founder of the Venetian school Paolo Veneziano.

The Virgin and Child was a popular subject matter among painters. Both Greek and Italian artists used the theme in countless works of art since the inception of the religion. The Virgin and Child enthroned was an important theme. The Greek term Pantanassa (Greek: Παντάνασσα), means the "Queen of All". The term was used to refer to the Virgin Mary as Queen of All. Greek painters created dozens of versions of the Madonna and Child Enthroned. Georgios Klontzas, Michael Damaskinos, Georgios Nomikos, and Emmanuel Tzanes are some of the painters that created their own versions. Tzanes's Lady the Lambovitissa is an example of the expert craftsmanship of the painters and the evolution of the style. Each version offers its own unique characteristics and style. The Virgin Pantanassa is one of the earliest surviving versions of the Cretan School attributed to a painter. It is located in the museum of the Monastery of Saint John the Theologian, Patmos, Greece.

== Description ==
The materials used for the massive painting were egg tempera and gold leaf on a wood panel. The height of the icon is 164 cm (64.5 in) and the width is 92 cm (36.2 in). The painting is over five feet tall. The work was completed between 1436 and 1492. The Virgin holds the child in the position known as Our Lady of the Sign. The position is also referred to as the Platitera and Nikopoios. The Italian term for the popular position is Nostra Signora del Segno. In the two variations, artists typically place the Virgin's hand on the right or left shoulder of the child and the other hand embraces the foot or leg of Jesus. The Virgin is wearing her traditional Byzantine garment. The holy robe clings to her body. The artist painted clear diagonal lines illustrating the complexly painted garment. The infant blesses with the Sign of the cross in his right hand and he holds a scroll in his left hand. The infant's garment is also the typical orange color. Both the Virgin and Child have halo's around their heads.

The furniture exemplifies early Cretan Renaissance painting. Italian masters Paolo Veneziano, Duccio, Cimabue and Giotto all created similar works in the same style. The top part of the throne is adorned with decorative wood spindles with alternating colors. Eight spindles are present. Around the Virgin's torso, the throne exhibits a triangular v-shape. The shadows and diagonal lines create a shallow space with three-dimensional characteristics. The technique was implemented by Italian masters Paolo Veneziano, Duccio, Cimabue and Giotto bringing Greek-Italian Byzantine art into the Italian Renaissance. The lower portion of the painting reflects the advancement and refinement of the Byzantine style. The steps continue to create the illusion of additional space. The throne is also decorated with inlaid red and green marbles. The pillow in Ritzos's work is comparable to pillows used in similar works created by Paolo Veneziano.

There are inscriptions all over the icon. The halo above the Virgin is decorated with an Ancient Greco-Roman styled Olive wreath motif. Ancient Greek art typically featured halos around deities and dignified individuals. Both Greek and Italian painters combined pagan and Byzantine art. The Halo was inscribed with the Greek words: Μνήστητη Κύριε Νεοφύτου Αρχιεπισκόπου Καρπάθου (Lord Remember, The Archbishop Neophytos of Karpathos). Neophytos was from Patmos. He made donations to different Monasteries. The two figures at the top left and right of the Virgin Mary are James the Apostle and Saint Christodoulos of Patmos. James the Apostle is on our left and Saint Christodoulos of Patmos is on the right. The painters signature is at the bottom of the work on the stairs of the throne ΧΕΙΡ ΑΝΔΡΕΟΥ ΡΙΤΖΟΥ.

== Gallery ==
=== Greek Masters ===
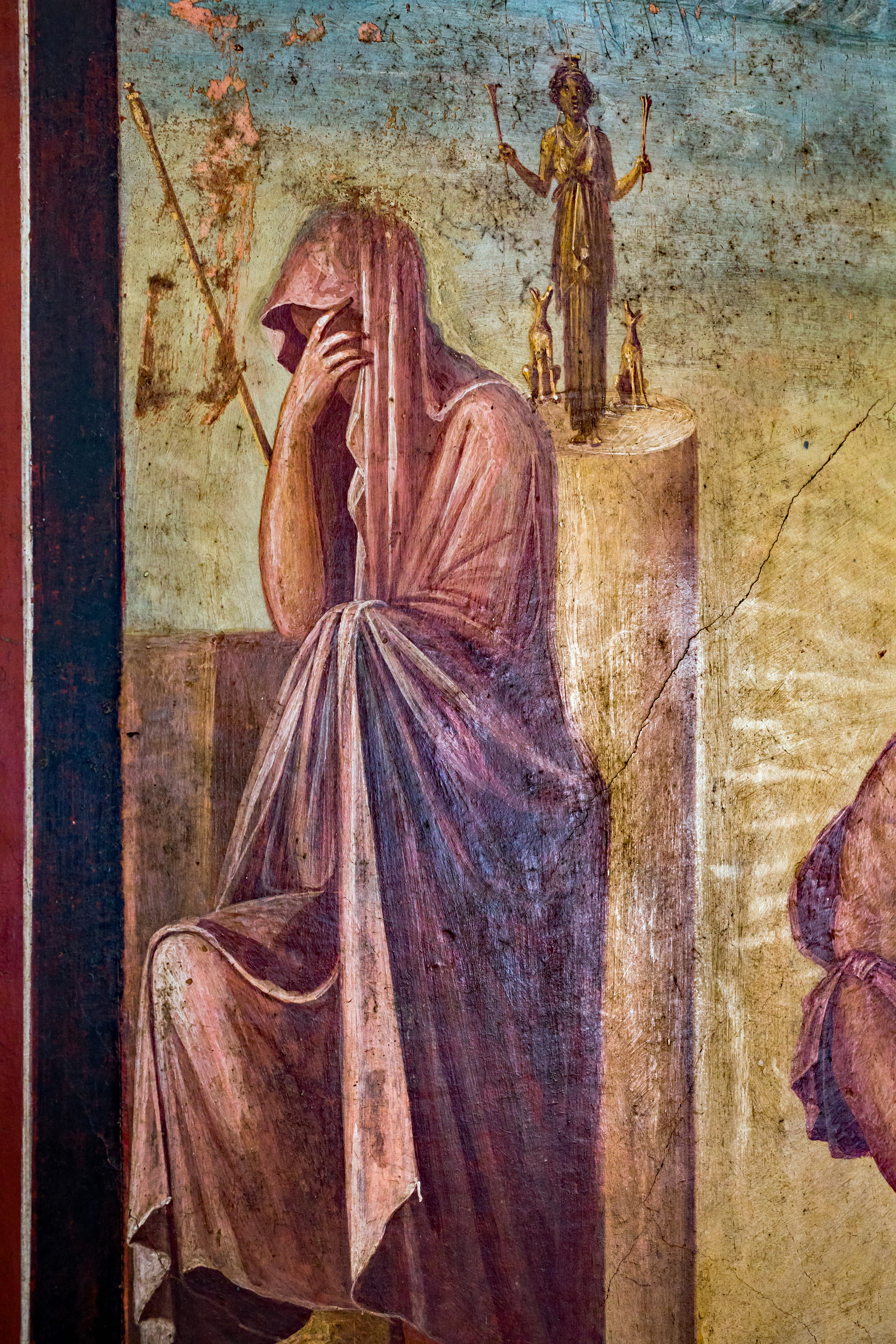
Ancient Greek first-century fresco from Pompeii the sacrifice of Iphigenia. The Virgin adopted a similar garment in paintings from ancient Greek times.

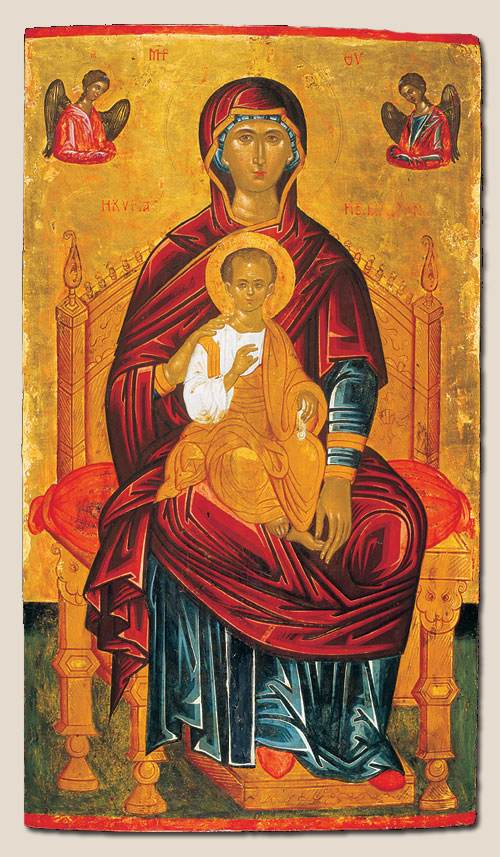
Second Virgin and Child Enthroned Ritzos

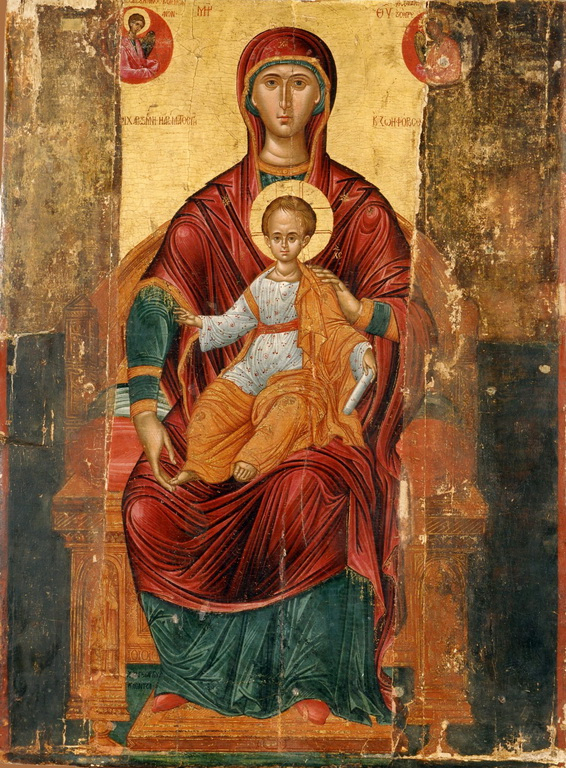
Virgin and Child Enthroned Klontzas

=== Italian Masters ===
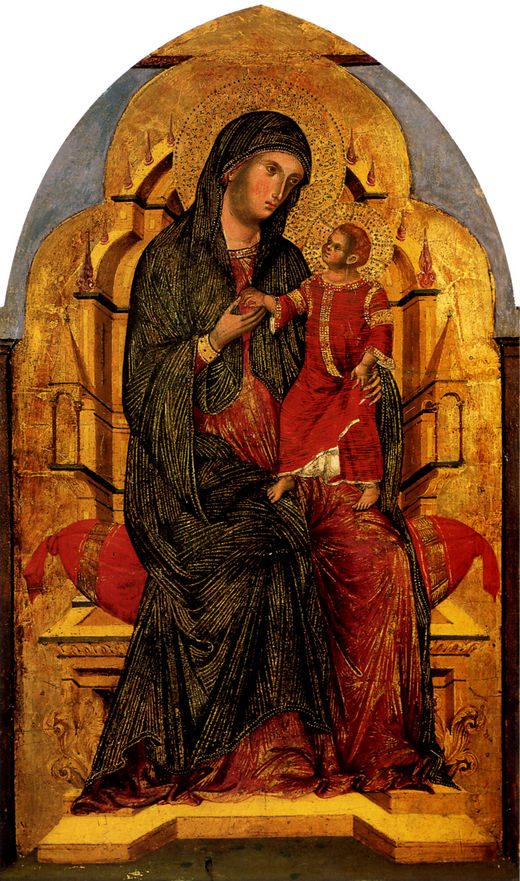
Veneziano's Madonna Enthroned

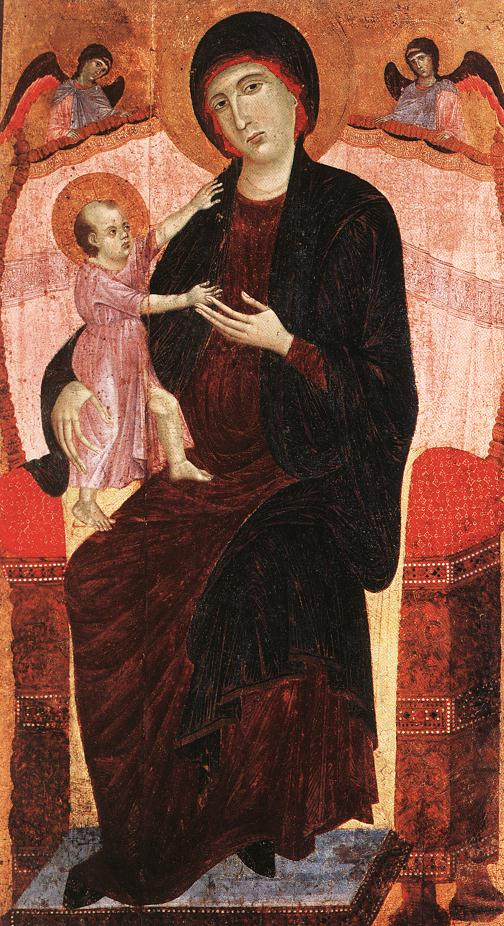
Duccio's Gualino Madonna

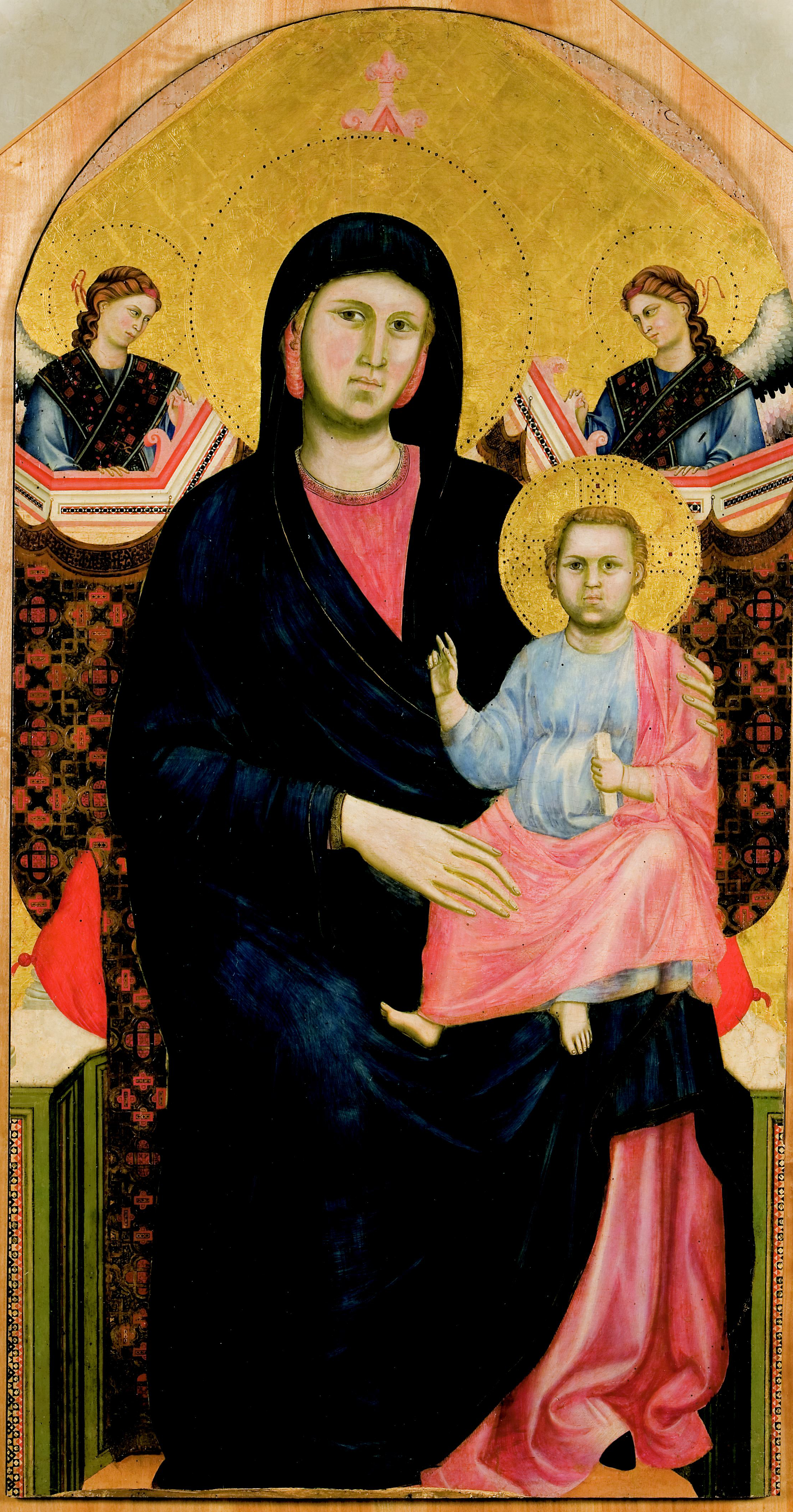
Giotto's Madonna di San Giorgio Alla Costa

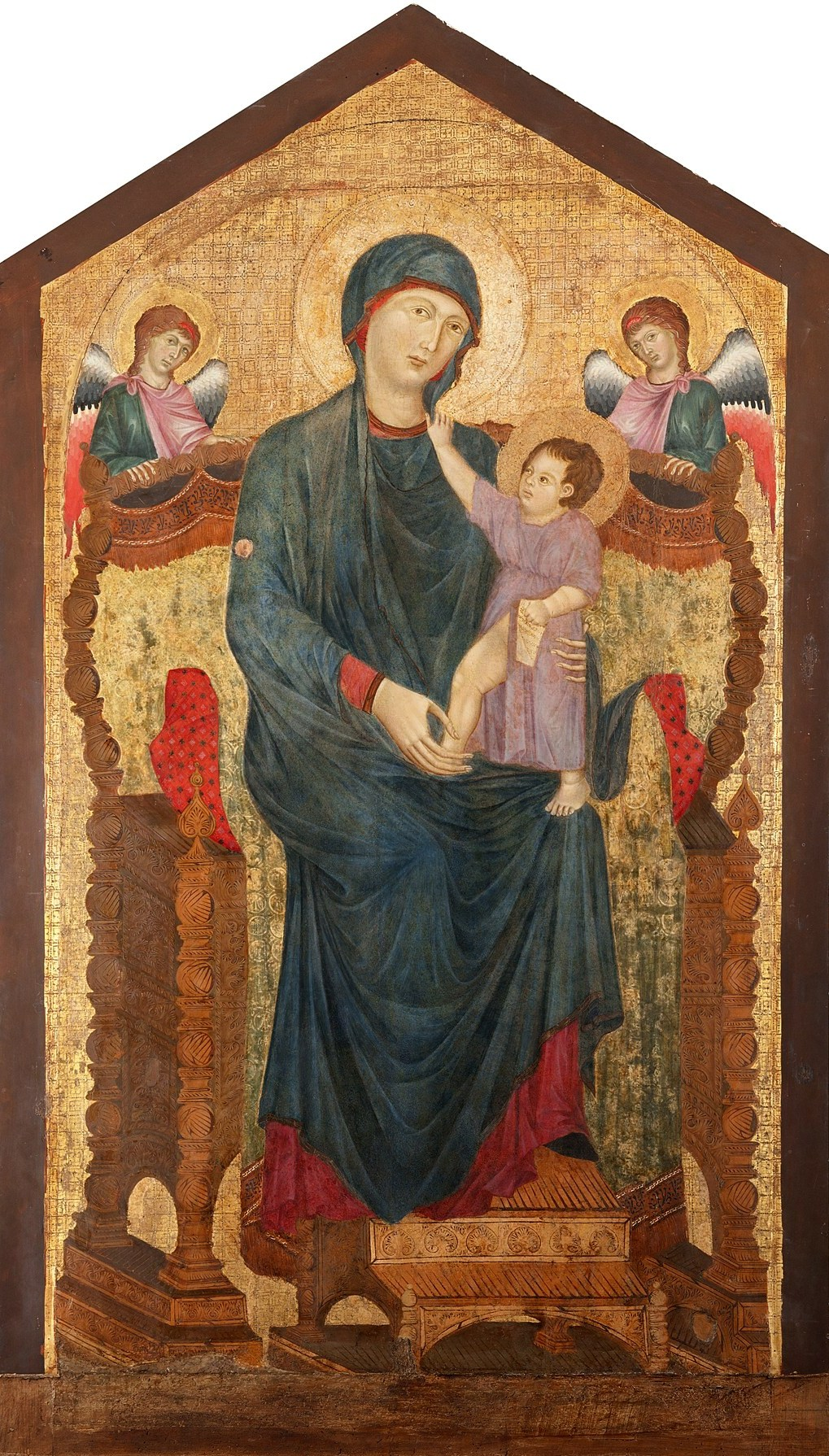
Cimabue's Maestà di Santa Maria Dei Servi

== See also ==
- Vestal Virgin
