= Spiridione Roma =

Greek painter (c. 1735 – 1786)

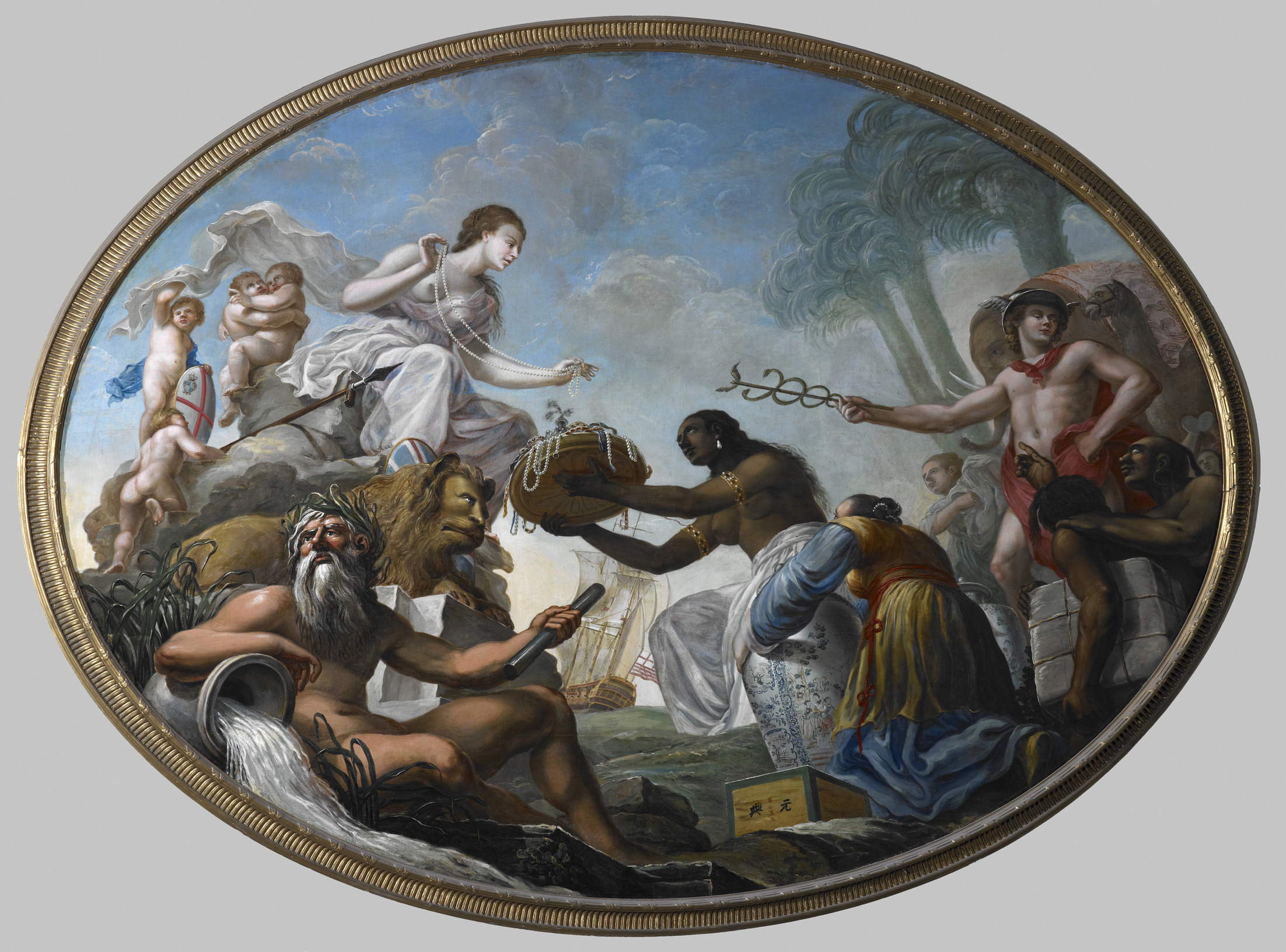
- The East Offering its Riches to Britannia
- Born: c. 1735; Corfu, Republic of Venice
- Died: 15 June 1786 (aged 50–51); London, England
- Movement: Heptanese school British painter
- Spouse: Margarita
- Patrons: Earl of Egremont

Spiridione Roma (c. 1735 – 15 June 1786), also known as Spiridon or Spyridon Romas (Greek: Σπυρίδων Ρώμας), was a Greek painter from Corfu. He was a prominent member of the Heptanese school. His contemporary was Spyridon Sperantzas, another painter from Corfu. He also painted all over Italy and settled in Triste. Romas painted on the Ionian Islands, Sicily, and Livorno before settling in England. He was one of the few Greek painters to travel to a foreign country outside of the Greek or Italian world. The other two were El Greco and Efstathios Altinis. He was also a British painter during the last decades of his life. He was active in the region from 1770 to 1786. According to the Hellenic Institute, over twenty-five of his works survived. He was the British El Greco. His most popular work is a painting entitled The East Offering its Riches to Britannia.

== History ==
Spyridon Romas was born in Corfu. His wife's name was Margarita. He had two daughters and a son. The state archives of Livorno indicate in 1762 a letter of recommendation was sent from Corfu to the Greek community of Livorno on behalf of Spyridon Romas. The painter signed a contract to decorate the Greek church of the Holy Trinity in Livorno in 1764 and 1766. Twenty paintings were completed for the church. He also completed work in Lecce, Sicily for the Greek church Chiesa Greco-Ortodossa di San Nicola. He was active in Sicily and central Italy before traveling to England. Archives indicate he was a prominent member of the Greek community in England. He was invited in 1770. He lived on Queen Anne St East. Records indicate his works were exhibited at the Royal Academy from 1774 to 1778. According to newspaper advertisements, he was a painter but also maintained paintings. Towards the end of his life, he worked for nobles, collectors, and art lovers. He was also associated with the Earl of Egremont He died on 15 June 1786.

His art drastically revolutionized the painting style of the Heptanese school. He followed the path of the Panayiotis Doxaras and his contemporaries. He refined traditional paintings of the Cretan school bringing the work into the more sophisticated Stile di pittura Ionico or stile Ionico. Romas was a proponent of the Ionian style. His works reflect his advanced knowledge of the style prevalent in the region. His painting style further evolved when he was exposed to Anglican paintings. He is one of the few Greek painters to completely abandon his Greek Italian painting roots.

== Britannia ==
He is best known for an allegorical ceiling piece, The East Offering its Riches to Britannia (1778), commissioned by the East India Company for the Revenue Committee Room in the East India House in London. The painting generally represents the era's panegyric to Britain's imperial and colonialist domination. The painting is described in the Gentleman's Magazine of 1778 as follows:

The principal figure represents Britannia seated on a rock, to signify the firmness and stability of the empire; and as guardian and protectress of the Company, who are denoted by children behind Britannia, and overshadowed by her veil. The union of the old and new Companies is expressed by two children embracing each other, and one of them placed sitting on the upper part of the rock, to show the firm basis on which the present Company stands; on the other part of the rock the child climbing up towards the summit is intended to express the prospect of the Company's continuance.

Britannia is characterised by the usual emblems of the shield and spear, and guarded by a lion, which lays tamely by her side, pleased with the offerings made her from the different East-Indian provinces.
At the foot of the rock lays the genius of the Ganges, in a majestic attitude, pouring out his whole stream on Britannia's footstool.
The various provinces are represented under the Conduct of Mercury, the god of merchandise, eagerly pressing to deposit their different produce and manufactures before the throne of Britannia.
Calcutta (the capital settlement of the Company in Bengal) presents a basket with pearls and other rich jewels, which Britannia receives.
China is characterised by jars of porcelain and chests of tea; the produce of Madras and Bombay by a corded bale; Bengal is denoted by an elephant, palm-trees and a camel.

Persia appears at a distance bringing silks, drugs, and other effects, and with her are to be supposed all the rest of the provinces; which the artist could not describe on the canvas without crowding or destroying the whole composition, and harmony of the picture. At a distance is an Indiaman under sail, laden with the treasure of the East, an emblem of that commerce from which both Britain and the Company derive great and singular advantages.

The painting is now in the Foreign and Commonwealth Office in London. A reproduction is held in the British Library in London. Other works by Roma in the British National Trust collections include An Illusionistic Gothic Patron's Pew, in the Extension of the Chapel (c.1769/1771).

== Gallery ==
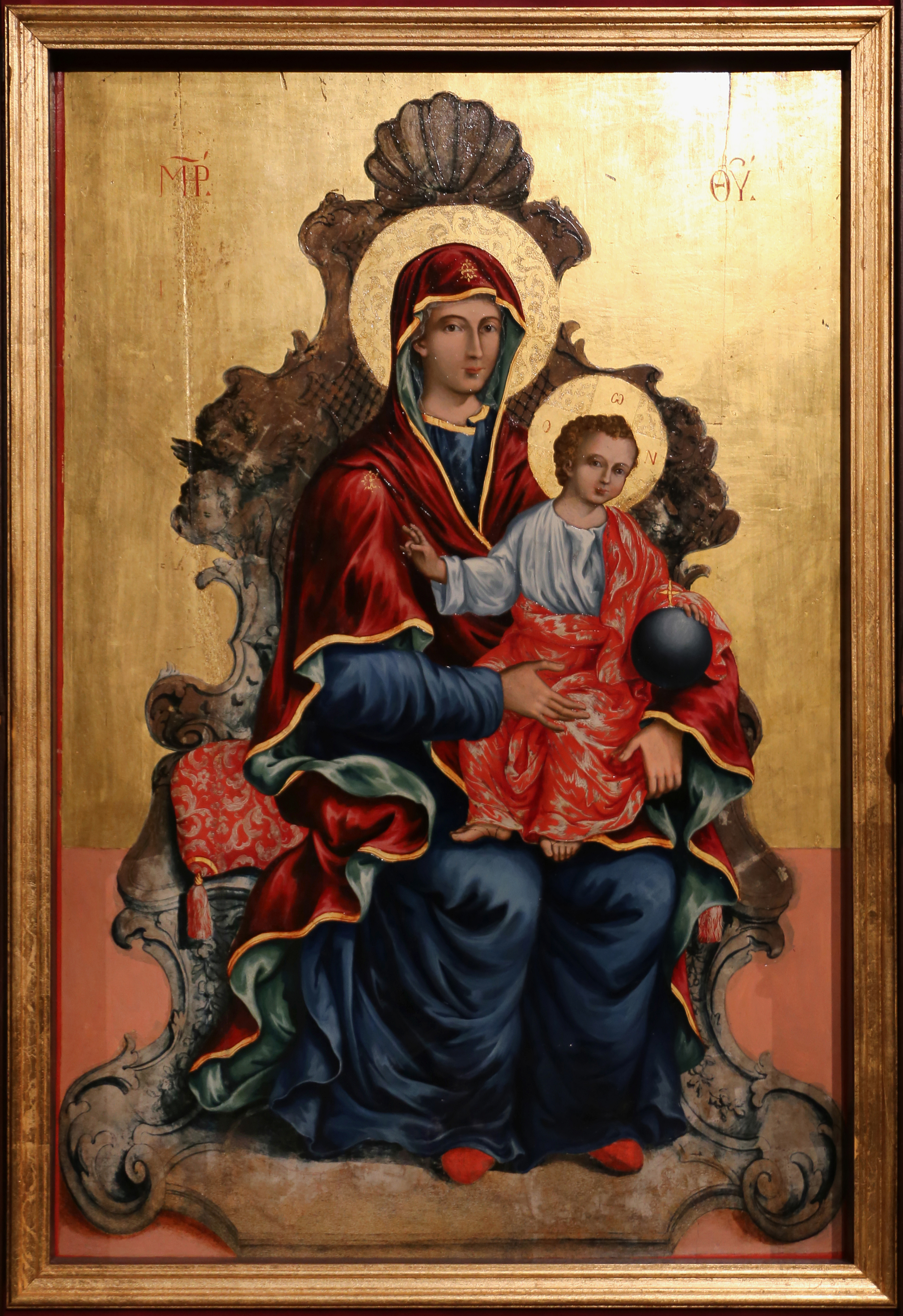
Madonna and Child

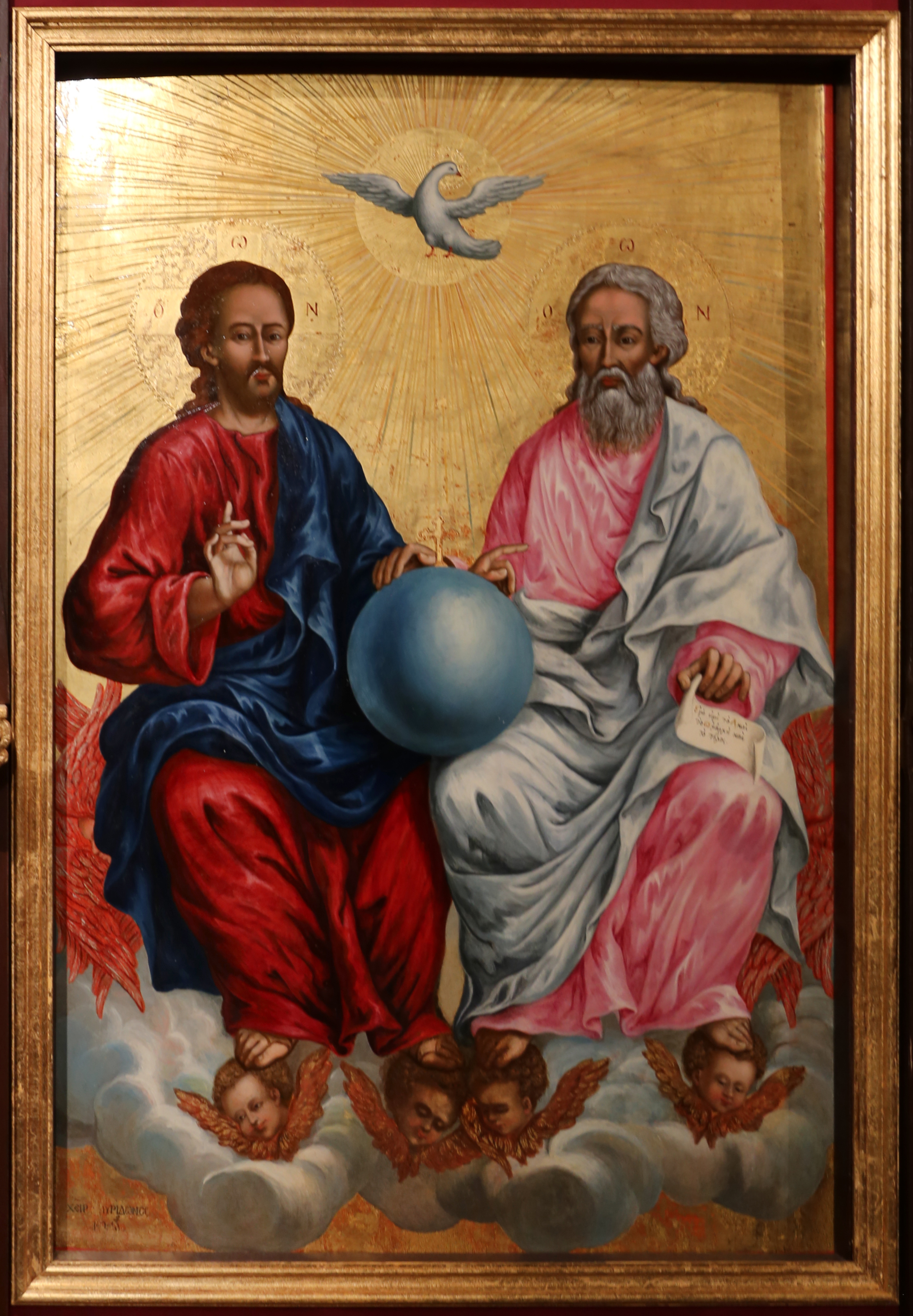
Holy Trinity

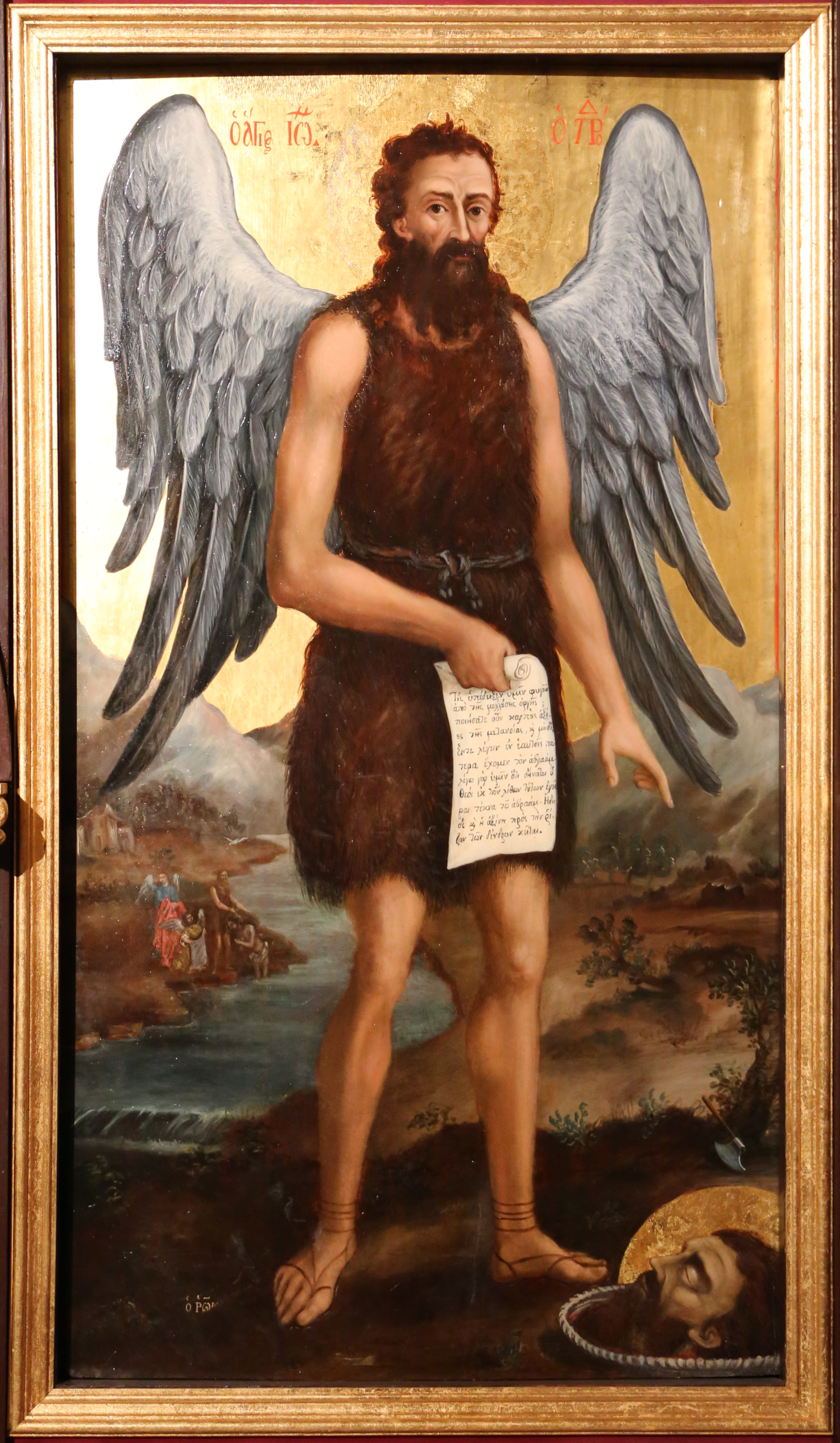
John the Baptist

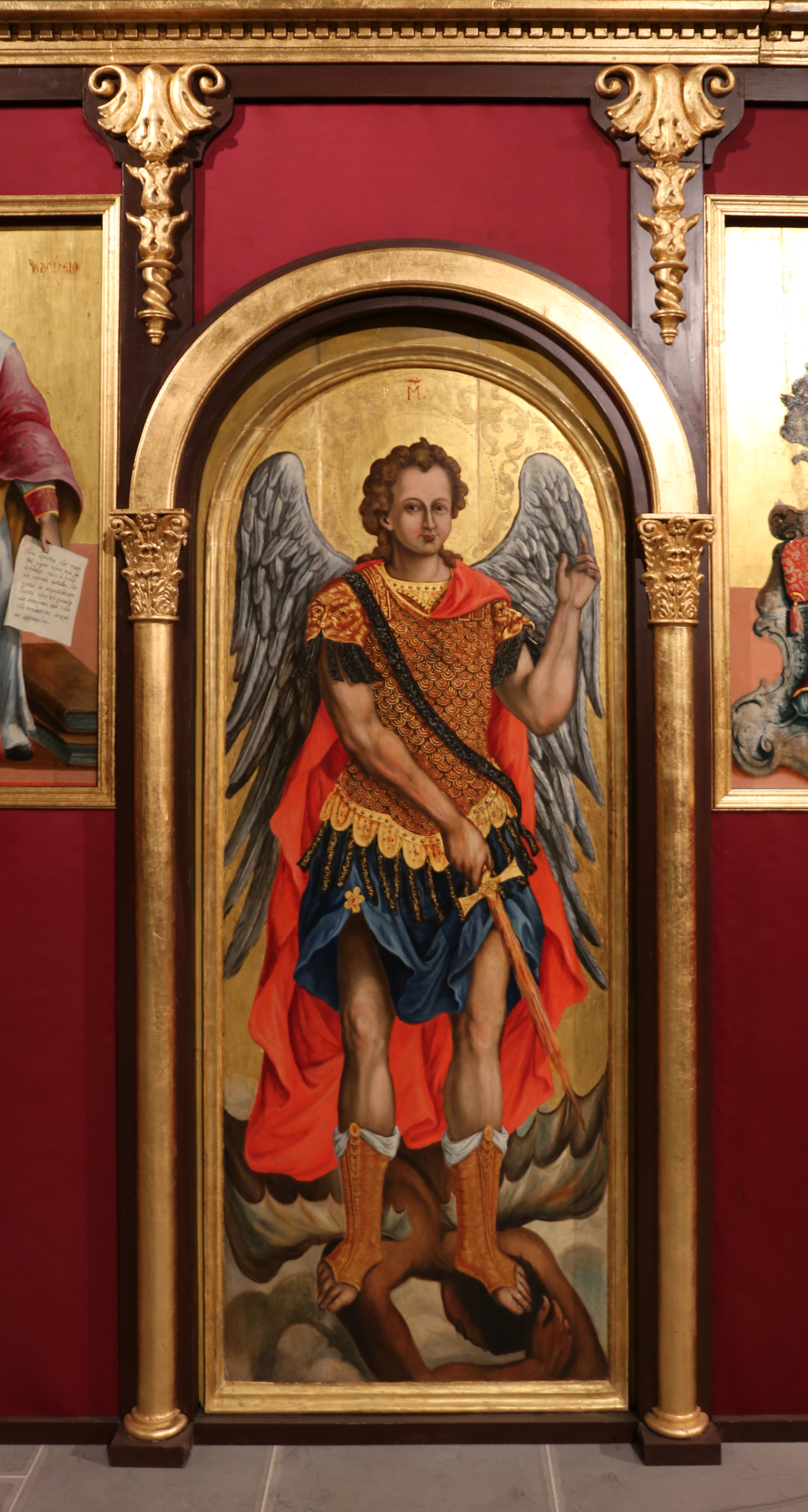
Saint Michael

== See also ==
- Constantine Rodocanachi
- Christopher Angelus

== Bibliography ==
- Hatzidakis, Manolis; Drakopoulou, Evgenia (1997). Έλληνες Ζωγράφοι μετά την Άλωση (1450-1830). Τόμος 2: Καβαλλάρος - Ψαθόπουλος [Greek Painters after the Fall of Constantinople (1450-1830). Volume 2: Kavallaros - Psathopoulos]. Athens: Center for Modern Greek Studies, National Research Foundation. hdl:10442/14088. ISBN 960-7916-00-X.
- Voulgaropoulou, Margarita (2018). "Cross-Cultural Encounters in the Twilight of the Republic of Venice: The Church of the Dormition of the Virgin in Višnjeva, Montenegro" (PDF). Journal of Modern Greek Studies. 36 (1). Baltimore, Maryland: Johns Hopkins University Press: 25–69. doi:10.1353/mgs.2018.0001. S2CID 85535270.
