= Christopher Angelus =

- Χριστόφορος Άγγελος
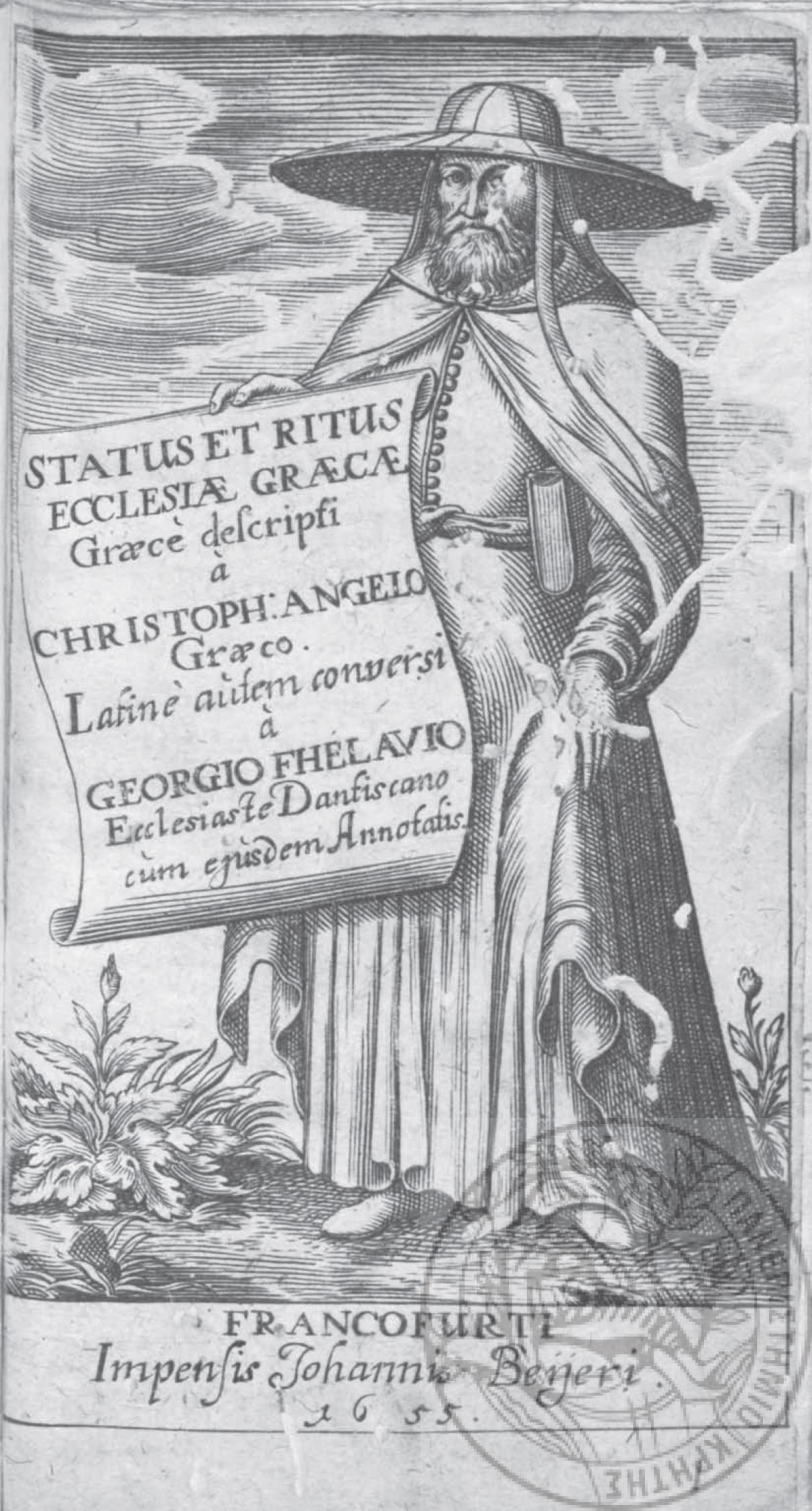
- Born: 1575; Gastouni, Eyalet of the Archipelago, Ottoman Empire
- Died: February 1, 1638 (aged 62–63); Oxford, Oxfordshire, Kingdom of England
- Education: Balliol College; Trinity College
- Occupation: Monk

Christopher Angelus (Gastune, 1575 – Oxford 1 February 1638), or Christophoros Angelos (Christopher Angel) was a native Greek of the Peloponnesus, who was persecuted by the Ottoman governor of Athens. Like several of his compatriots, he found refuge in the Jacobean universities of Oxford and Cambridge.

== Life ==
After periods spent in Athens, where he was tortured by the Ottoman authorities, and briefly in Flanders, he sailed in an English ship for Yarmouth in 1608. The Bishop and other clergy of Norwich received him hospitably (he claimed to have received a gold coin from the bishop), and he was sent with an introduction by the bishop to the Hellenists in Cambridge, arriving in Trinity College, Cambridge.

He moved, for the sake of his health, to Oxford in 1610, where he matriculated in Balliol College and read Greek with the younger students. He appears to have been settled in Oxford by 1617. He spent most of the remainder of his life there (with periods in Cambridge) until his death on 1 February 1638, where he was buried at St. Ebbe's church on Candlemas Day, leaving the character of ‘a pure Grecian and an honest and harmless man.’

== Works ==
Angelos wrote several successful works in Greek, the most well known of which, describing the contemporary state of the Greek church, was originally published in Cambridge as an Encheiridion in 1619 but received wider European circulation due to its Latin translation of the 1655 'Status et Ritus Ecclesiae Graecae' by George Fehlau (Fhelavius). In his lifetime, Angelos was probably better known for his 'Ponesis' (suffering), graphically describing his treatment at the hands of the Turks. This contains a lithography of his torment and of a symbolic Britannia. This was published at Oxford in 1617, whereas his 'An Encomium of the famous Kingdome of Great Britaine and of the two flourishing Sister-Universities Cambridge and Oxford' (principal text in Greek) was not surprisingly printed by Cantrel Legge for the University of Cambridge in 1619.

A study of Apostasy (also in Greek) appeared in London in 1624. Examples of his work are:

- Of the many Stripes and Torments inflicted on Christopher Angelus by the Turks for the faith which he had in Jesus Christ, Oxford, 1617.
- An Encomium of the famous Kingdome of Great Britaine, and of the two flourishing sister Universities, Oxford and Cambridge, Cambridge, 1619. Both these are in Greek and English.
- Enchiridion de Institutis Græcorum, Cambridge, 1619; an account in Greek and Latin of the rites of the Greek church. A Latin version by George Fhelan was published at Frankfort, 1655, Status et Ritus Ecclesiæ Græcæ, and an enlarged edition of the latter version, called De Statu hodiernorum Græcorum Enchiridion, at Leipzig in 1679 in Cyprius's Chronicon Ecclesiæ Græcæ.
- Labor Christophori Angeli, Græci, de Apostasia Ecclesiæ et de homine peccati, scilicet Antichristi, &c., London, 1624; an attempt to identify Mahomet with Antichrist, and to prove that the last Mahomet will be destroyed in 1876.

== See also ==
- Constantine Rodocanachi
- Spiridione Roma

== Bibliography ==
- Stephanos Makryichalos, ho hellenodidaskalos tes Oxphordes (1575-1638), Athens, Myrtide, 1957
- MDZ Münchener Digitalisierungs Zentrum Digitale Bibliothek: Christophoros Angelos
