= Constantine Rodocanachi =

Ottoman Greek physician, chemist and lexicographer

Constantine Rodocanachi, also Rhodocanaces or Rhodocanakis (Greek: Κωνσταντίνος Ροδοκανάκης, romanized: Konstantinos Rodokanakis; 1635–1687) was an Ottoman Greek physician to Charles II of England, chemist, lexicographer and academic. Rodocanachi was born on the island of Chios on 5 December 1635 and lived much of his life in London.

Rodocanachi worked on the 1685 version of Lexicon manuale Græco-Latinum, & Latino-Græcum with Cornelis Schrevel and Joseph Hill (lexicographer). Rodocanachi also compounded his own medicines and sold them in London and abroad. He published a pamphlet titled Alexicacus, Spirit of Salt of the World in 1664, which promoted his panacea (medicine) salt solution.

== Personal life ==
Rodocanachi was the son of Dimitrios Rodocanachi (1592–1664) and Theodora. In 1667, Rodocanachi married Arietta Coressi (1653–1693), daughter of Antonio Coressi and Viera Visconti. The couple had at least three children: Constantine (1667–1689), who died in Cambridge; Loula (1672–1710), who was born in Chios and married Frangoulis Rodocanachi (1666–1753); and Maria (1678–1688), who was born and died in London. Constantine Rodocanachi died in Amsterdam on 13 August 1687.

== Published works ==
- Constantine Rhodocanaces, A Discourse in the Praise of Antimonie, and the Vertues thereof, self-published, London, 1664. See in Google Books
- Constantine Rhodocanaces, Alexicacus, Spirit of Salt of the World, R. D., London, 1664. See in Google Books
- Constantine Rhodocanaces, Carmina Græca Rythmica Gratulatoria, A. & L. Lichfield, Oxford, 1660. See in Google Books
- Constantine Rhodocanaces, Life and writings of Constantine Rhodocanakis, a prince of the Imperial Houses of Doucas, Angelus, Comnenus, Paleologus, and honorary physician to Charles II, King of England, France and Ireland, The Printing House of the Journal of Debates, Athens, 1872. See in Google Books
- Cornelis Schrevel, Joseph Hill & Constantine Rhodocanaces, Lexicon manuale Græco-Latinum, & Latino-Græcum: Primo concinnatum, Térque editum, Joan. Hayes, Cambridge, 1685. See in Google Books

== See also ==
- Christopher Angelus
- Spiridione Roma
