= The Holy Trinity (Romas) =

Painting by Spiridione Roma

- Αγία Τριάδα (Greek), Ss.ma Trinità del Nuovo Testamento (Italian)
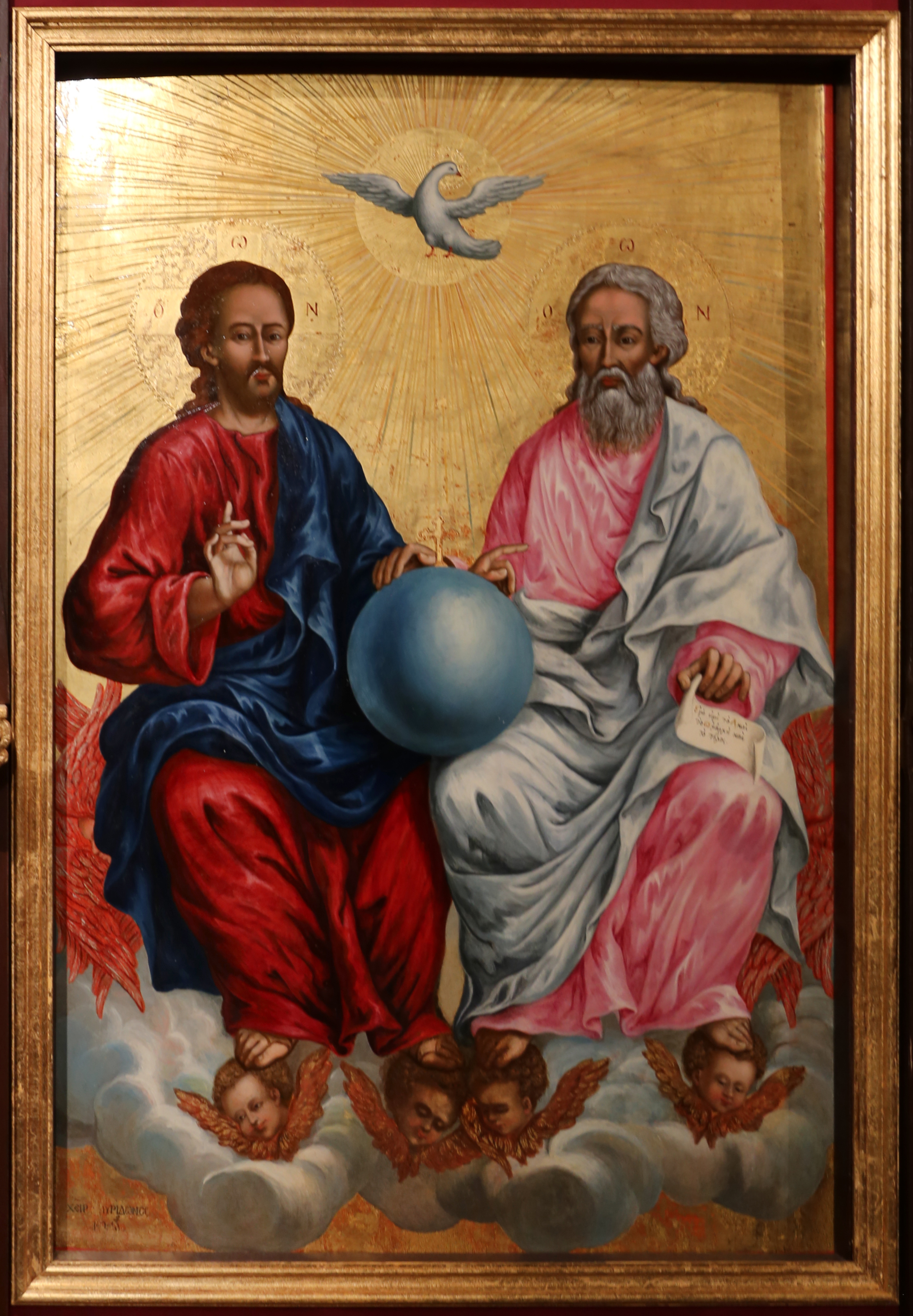
- Artist: Spiridione Roma
- Year: 1764
- Medium: tempera on wood
- Movement: Heptanese School
- Subject: God, Jesus Christ, the Holy Spirit portrayed by a Dove.
- Dimensions: 117 cm × 78 cm (46.1 in × 30.7 in)
- Location: Museo della Città di Livorno (Museum of the City of Livorno), Livorno, Italy
- Owner: Museo della Città di Livorno
- Accession: 1278

The Holy Trinity is a tempera painting created by Spyridon Romas. He was a Greek painter from Corfu. He was a prominent member of the Heptanese School. He was active from 1745 to 1786. He traveled all over the world. He painted in Corfu, Lecce, Livorno, and London. According to the Hellenic Institute over 25 of his works survived. He is one of the few Greek painters to completely adopt a new style of painting. He traveled to London, England around 1770 and remained in the country until his death. He painted several portraits but also maintained artwork in the region. An iconostasis with most of his works is superlatively preserved in Livorno, Italy at the Museo della Città di Livorno (Museum of the City of Livorno).

The Trinity is an integral part of the Christian religion. There have been many interpretations and debates about the subject. The Trinity historically refers to the Father (God), Son (Jesus), and the Holy Spirit. Countless Greek and Italian painters adopted the subject. Masaccio painted an Italian version known as the Holy Trinity. It was a very popular theme. A notable Greek-style version of the subject was painted in Constantinople around the 1450s by a Greek master. The painting is part of the collection at the Cleveland Museum in the United States. Painters of the Cretan School and the Heptanese School adopted the theme. Notable versions were painted by Thomas Bathas, Michael Damaskinos, Elias Moskos and Emmanuel Tzanes. In Damaskino's Tribute to the Eucharist Jesus is sitting on a circular globe with an elaborate decorative motif. The globe and motif were also added to different versions of the Holy Trinity paintings. Roma's also added a similar sphere to his work. The painting is part of the collection at the Livorno City Museum.

== Description ==
The materials used were tempera paint, gold leaf, and wood panel. The height is 117 cm (46.1 in.) and the width is 78 cm (30.7 in.). Romas completed the work in 1764 for the Trinity Greek Orthodox church in Livorno, Italy. The icon was part of the iconostasis of the destroyed church. The church was torn down in 1942 because of a city rehabilitation project. The works of art were moved to a museum. The icon has evolved relative to its early predecessors. The painting is in line with comparable works of the Heptanese School. Compared to the Bathas version the figures are more detailed. The folds of fabric feature more realistic lines and grooves. The artist used a refined method of light and shadow. The sphere represents the earth. A cross appears on top of the sphere. Jesus is to our left, His right hand is depicted offering a blessing, upon which spells the name and title of Jesus through the gesture, "IC XC", Greek abbreviations that spell out "Jesus Christ", "ΙΗΣΟΥΣ ΧΡΙΣΤΟΣ". With His other hand resting upon the globe, He points to the figure on the right. His celestial robe is floating in a spaceless setting. The painter used the traditional brilliant blue and red color, within iconography, traditionally symbolizing the two natures of Christ; the blue representing His Divinity, while the red representing His humanity. Jesus's flesh tones and facial features exhibit a refined realism. The figure on the right portrays God the Father, a similar figure is present in Masaccio's Holy Trinity, though the depiction of the Father itself resembles many other pieces of artwork and iconography, especially within Western art. His hair and facial features are painted in detail, His hair is depicted as white, which is said to mirror the appearance of the Ancient of Days, as described in the vision of the Prophet Daniel, traditionally interpreted to be the Father appearing in such a form. His majestic celestial garment exhibits striations. The Father holds a scroll is His left hand. The Father's other hand rests on the globe. Both figures are floating on angel heads and clouds. Behind the two figures, the artist painted parts of the angelic seraphim. The white dove symbolizing the Holy Spirit floats above both figures in front of a sunlike sphere. An aura radiates from the Holy Spirit coating the entire gold background. The depiction of the Holy Spirit as a white dove mirrors His appearance during the Theophany of Christ. The traditional Greek symbols are featured within the halos of the Father, Son, and Holy Spirit, which spells out God's title from Exodus, "I AM WHO I AM", "Ὁ ὬΝ" in Greek.

== Gallery ==
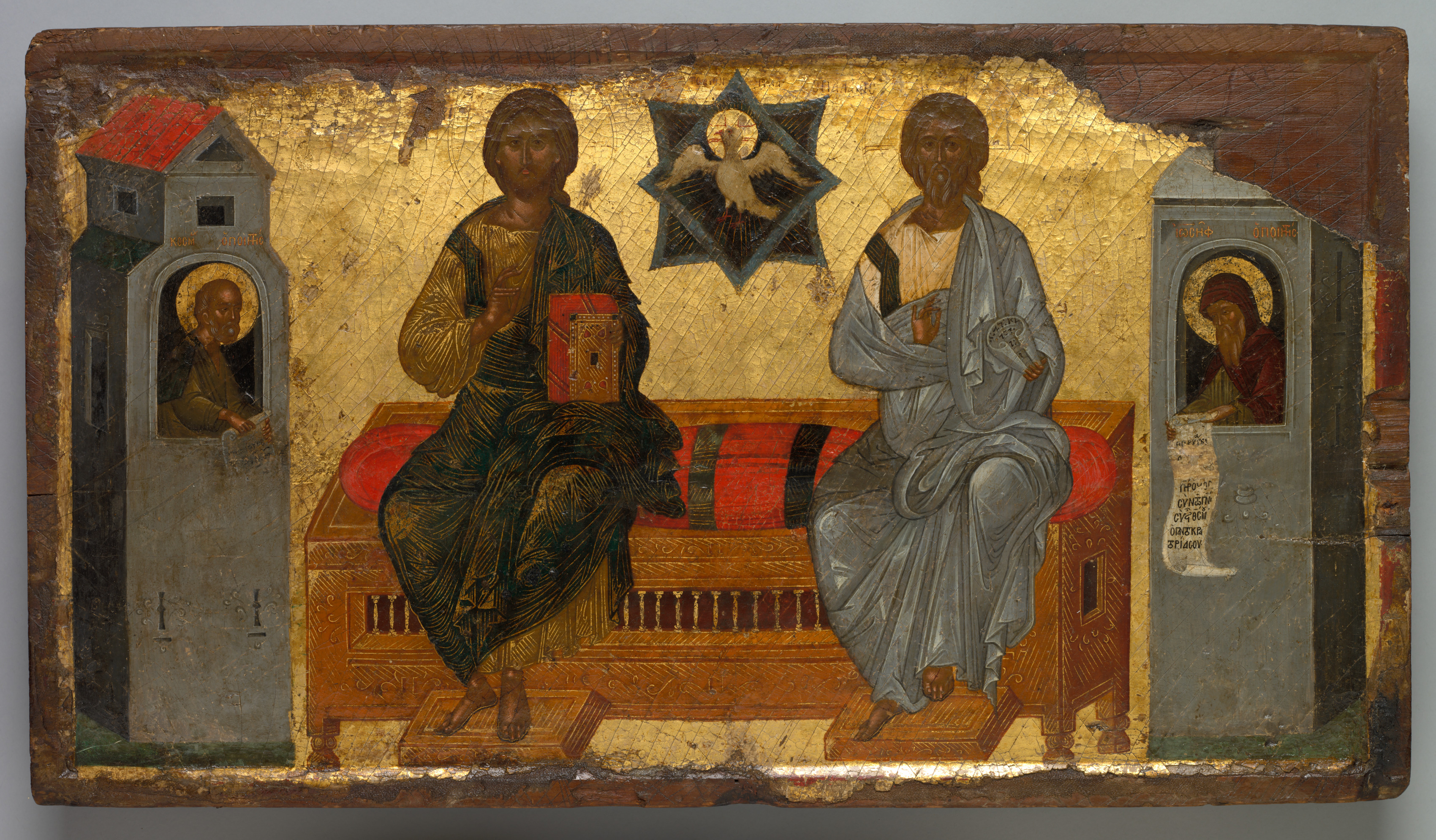
The Holy Trinity

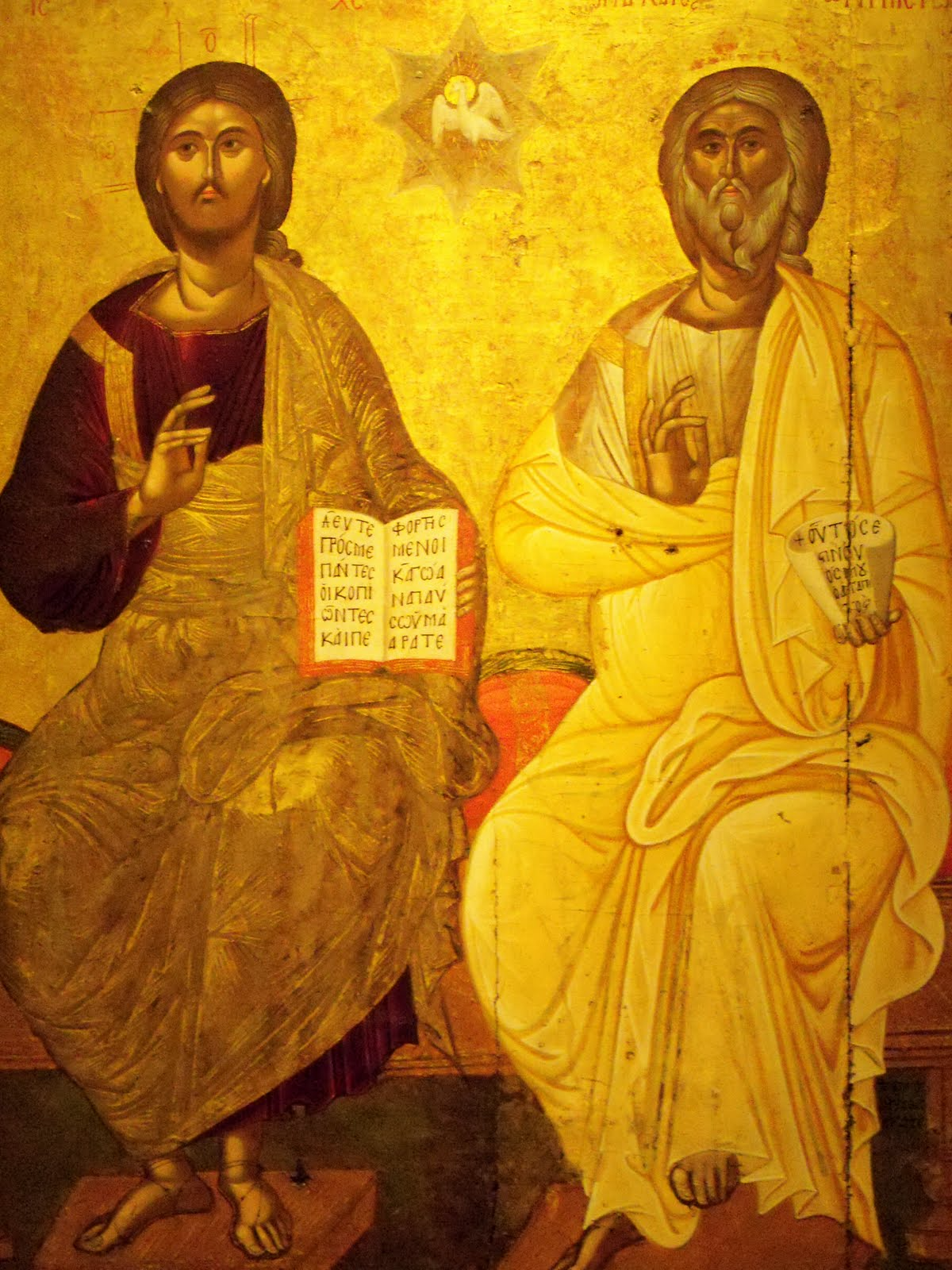
The Holy Trinity Bathas

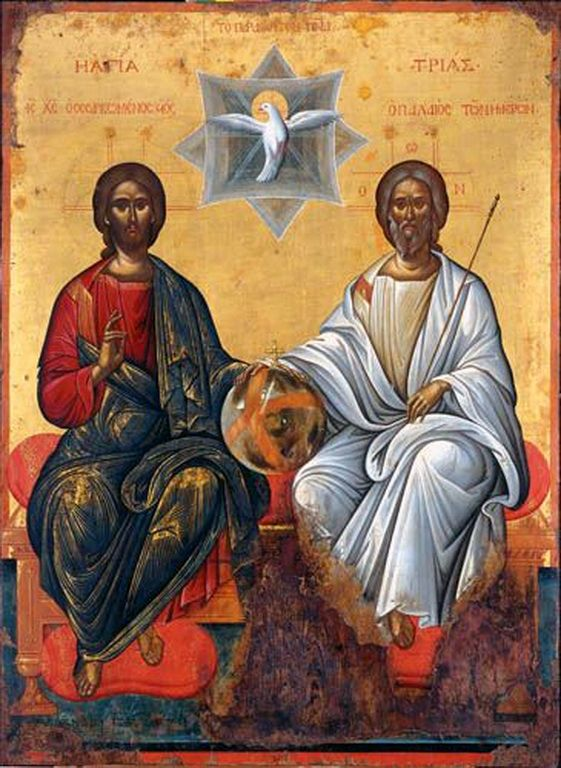
The Holy Trinity Damaskenos

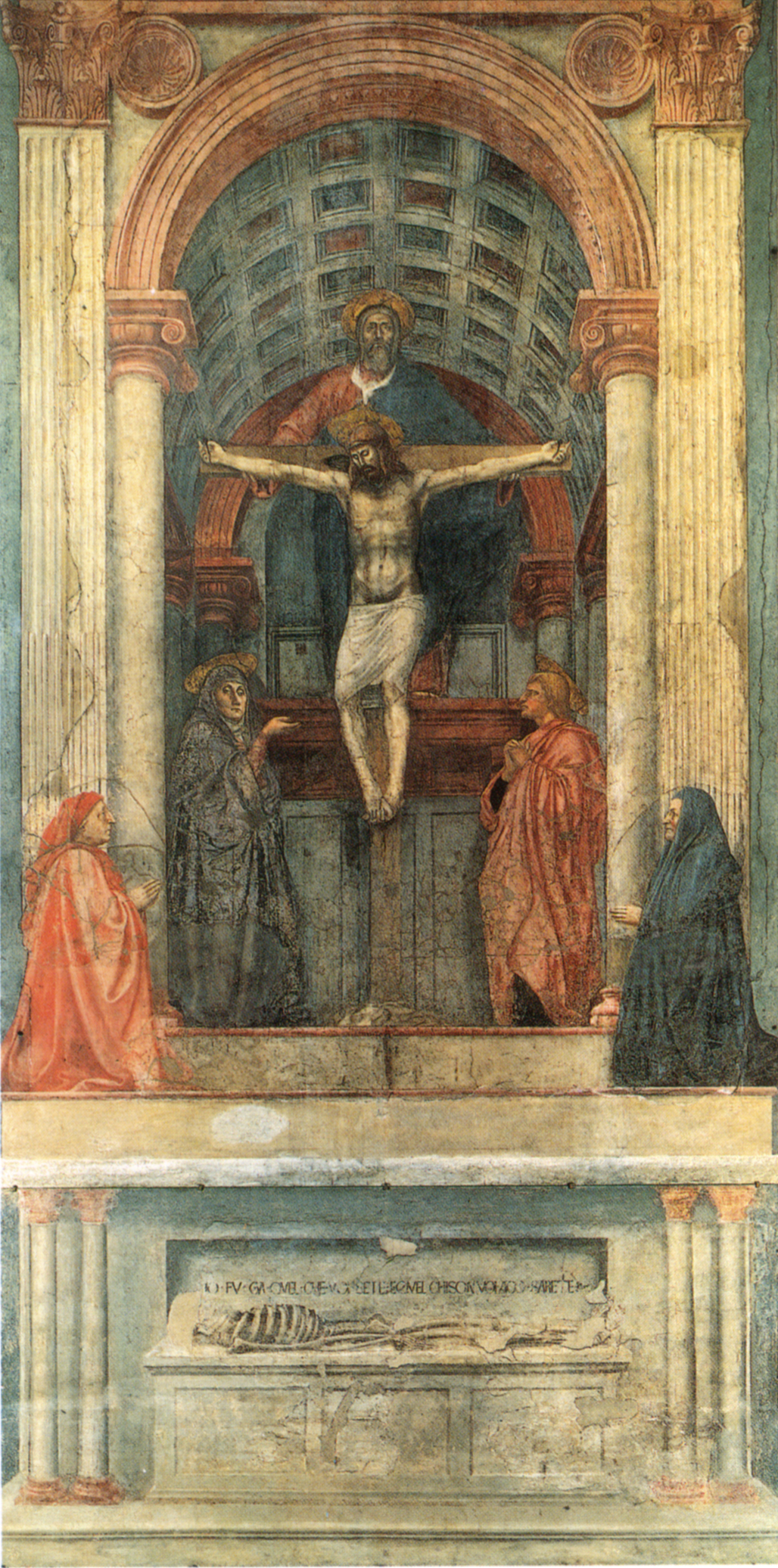
Holy Trinity Masaccio

== Bibliography ==
- Hatzidakis, Manolis; Drakopoulou, Evgenia (1997). Έλληνες Ζωγράφοι μετά την Άλωση (1450-1830). Τόμος 2: Καβαλλάρος - Ψαθόπουλος [Greek Painters after the Fall of Constantinople (1450-1830). Volume 2: Kavallaros - Psathopoulos]. Athens: Center for Modern Greek Studies, National Research Foundation. hdl:10442/14088. ISBN 960-7916-00-X.
