= Lady the Lambovitissa =

Painting by Emmanuel Tzanes

- Η Κυρία η Λαμποβίτισσα (Greek), Madonna con Bambino Lambovitissa (Italian)
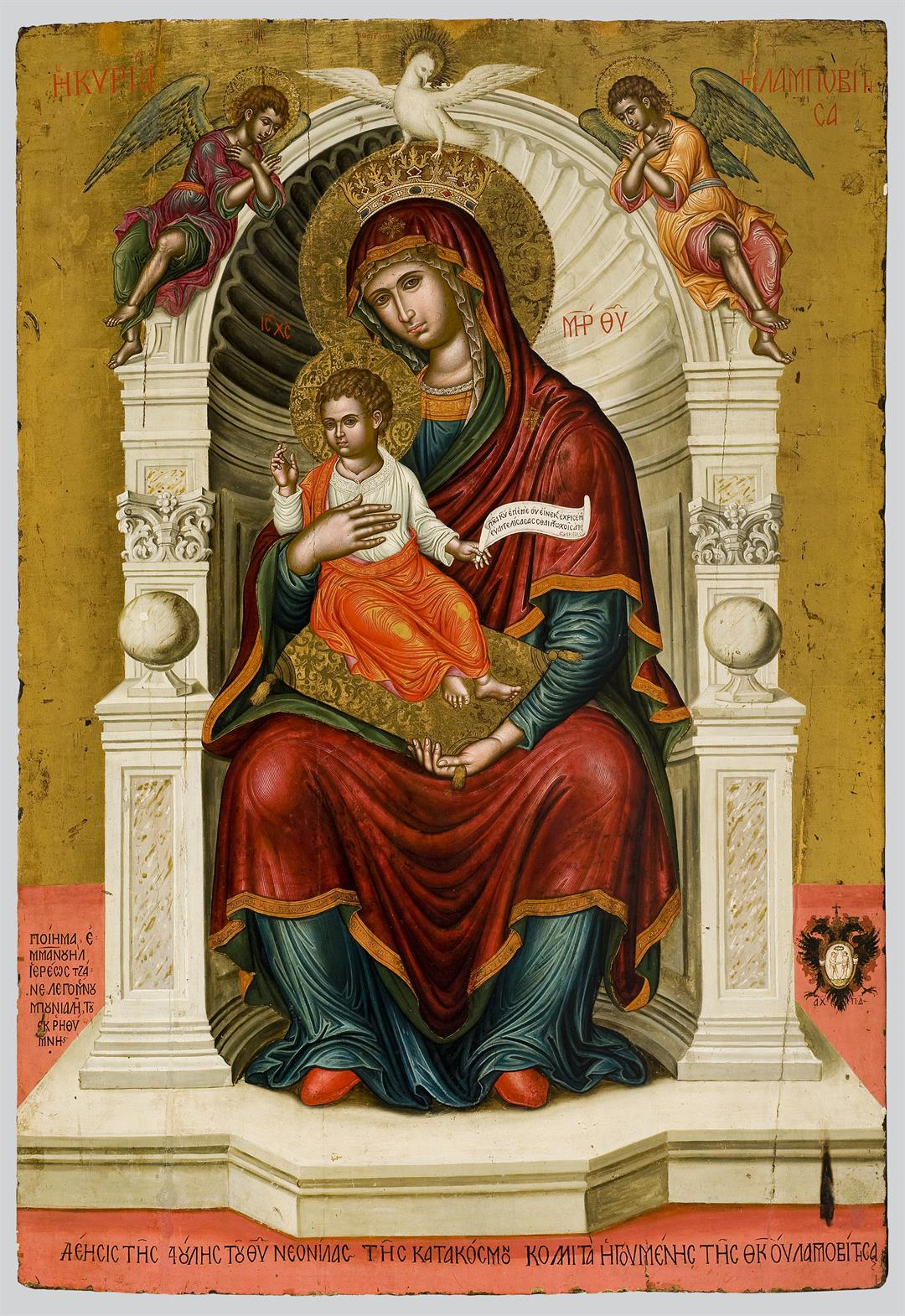
- Artist: Emmanuel Tzanes
- Year: 1684
- Catalogue: ΒΧΜ 13230
- Medium: tempera on wood
- Movement: Late Cretan School
- Subject: Virgin and Child enthroned inside shell headed niche
- Dimensions: 153 cm × 103 cm (60.2 in × 40.6 in)
- Location: Byzantine and Christian Museum, Athens, Greece
- Owner: Byzantine and Christian Museum
- Website: Official Website

Lady the Lambovitissa is a tempera painting by Emmanuel Tzanes. Tzanes was a Greek painter active from 1625 to 1690. His artistic periods can be broken into three parts. The Cretan Period (1625-1647), The Corfu Period (1647-1655), and the Venetian Period (1655-1690). He was a prominent member of the Late Cretan School. His art was heavily influenced by Greek painter Michael Damaskinos. His brothers Marinos Tzanes and Konstantinos Tzanes were both painters. Tzanes has a massive art collection attributed to him nearing over one hundred thirty works. During the Corfu Period (1647-1655), Konstantinos Tzanes and Emmanuel were heavily active. They painted many works on the island.

The Virgin and Child enthroned was a popular theme painted by both Greek and Italian Byzantine painters. One of the most famous renditions is in Hagia Sophia. Cretan Painters adopted the theme. Georgios Klontzas and Andreas Ritzos both have notable versions. Lady the Lambovitissa was completed 1684. Konstantinos also created a similar version of the Virgin and Child Enthroned in Corfu around 1654. The Konstantinos version is still in Corfu at the Cathedral of Saint James and Saint Christopher. Lady the Lambovitissa features similarities to the style of Nikolaos Tzafouris. Lady the Lambovitissa derived its name from the Lambovitissa Monastery in Corfu. The painting is part of the Dionysios Loverdos Collection at the Byzantine and Christian Museum.

== Description ==
The materials used for the massive icon were egg tempera paint on wood. The painter also used gold leaf. The painting was completed in 1684. The height is 60.2 in (152.9 cm) and the width is 40.6 in (103.1 cm) exactly five feet tall. The Virgin is seated within a niche. Many painters used the niche in their works. The Madonna and Child by Filippo Lippi also features a similar shell-like niche behind the Virgin Mary. The Virgin is seated in a niche-like throne in Emmanuel's painting. The throne is elaborately decorated. Both Konstantinos and Emmanuel painted a similar throne. Konstantino's version lacks the shell like niche. In Emmanuel's version the Theotokos is crowned by a white dove while in Konstantino's version the Theotokos is crowned by two angels. Emmanuel's angels marvel at the Virgin and Child. The majestic throne features two symmetric decorative round orbs. Above the orbs follow two symmetric corinthian-like columns. The Virgin's heavenly crown is adorned with precious jewels.

The Virgin's face is very natural. The child is looking at the viewer. The child holds a banner in his left hand versus the typical scroll prevalent in Cretan paintings. The child is seated on an elaborately decorated pillow. Both the Virgin and Child are dressed in majestic attire. The artist's color palette for the main figures features red, blue, green, and orange. The painter presents luxuriant patterns and brilliant colors. The folds of fabric and shadows are clearly evident. Konstantinos uses more shadows to provide a sense of realism. The detail in Emmanuel's work is featured around the Virgin's legs. Brilliant diagonal lines, patterns, and shadows are present. The shadows illustrate a three-dimensional throne. Both brothers elevated the Greek style to another level defining the Late Cretan School.

== Gallery ==
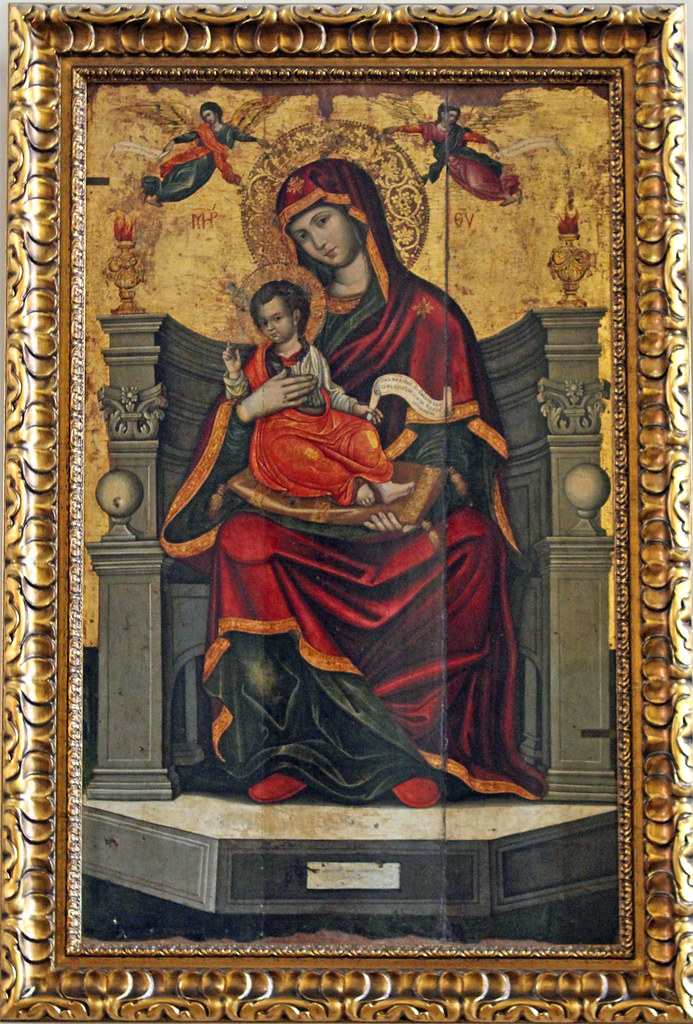
Virgin and Child Enthroned Konstantinos

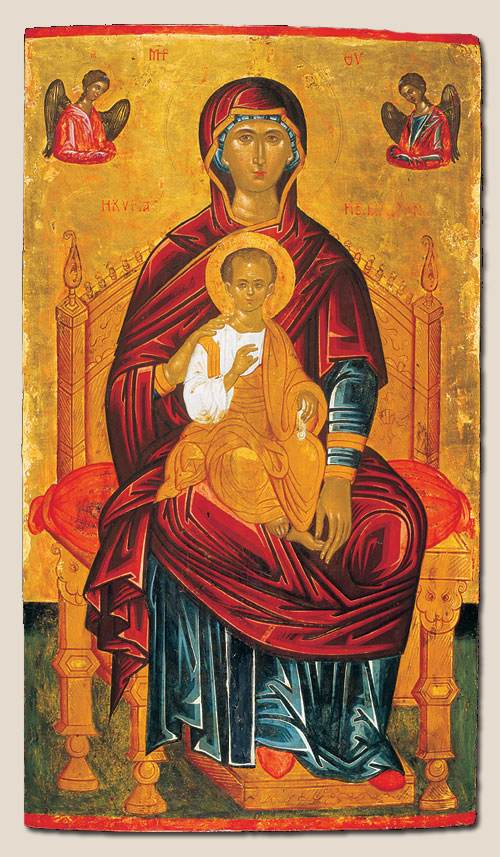
Virgin and Child Enthroned Ritzos

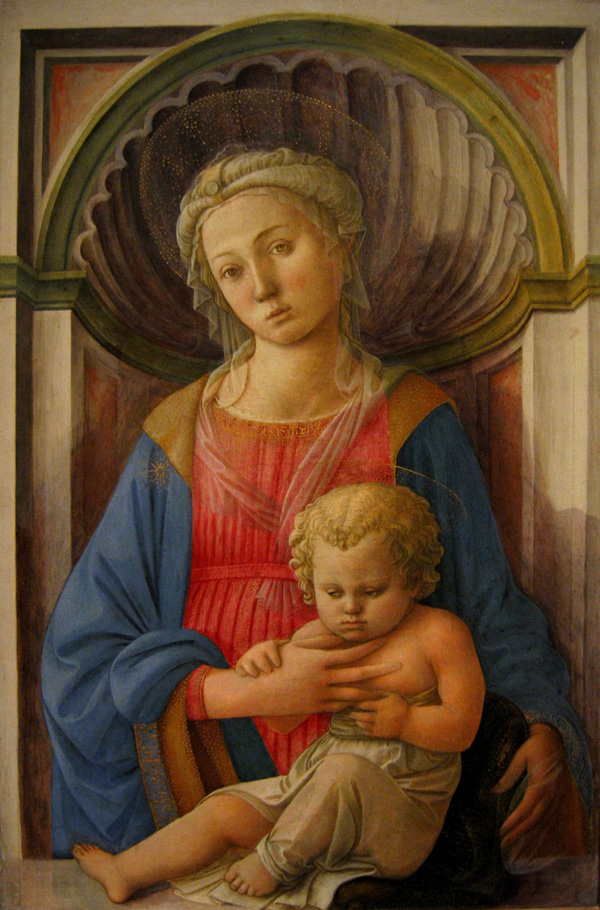
Virgin and Child inside niche Filippo Lippi

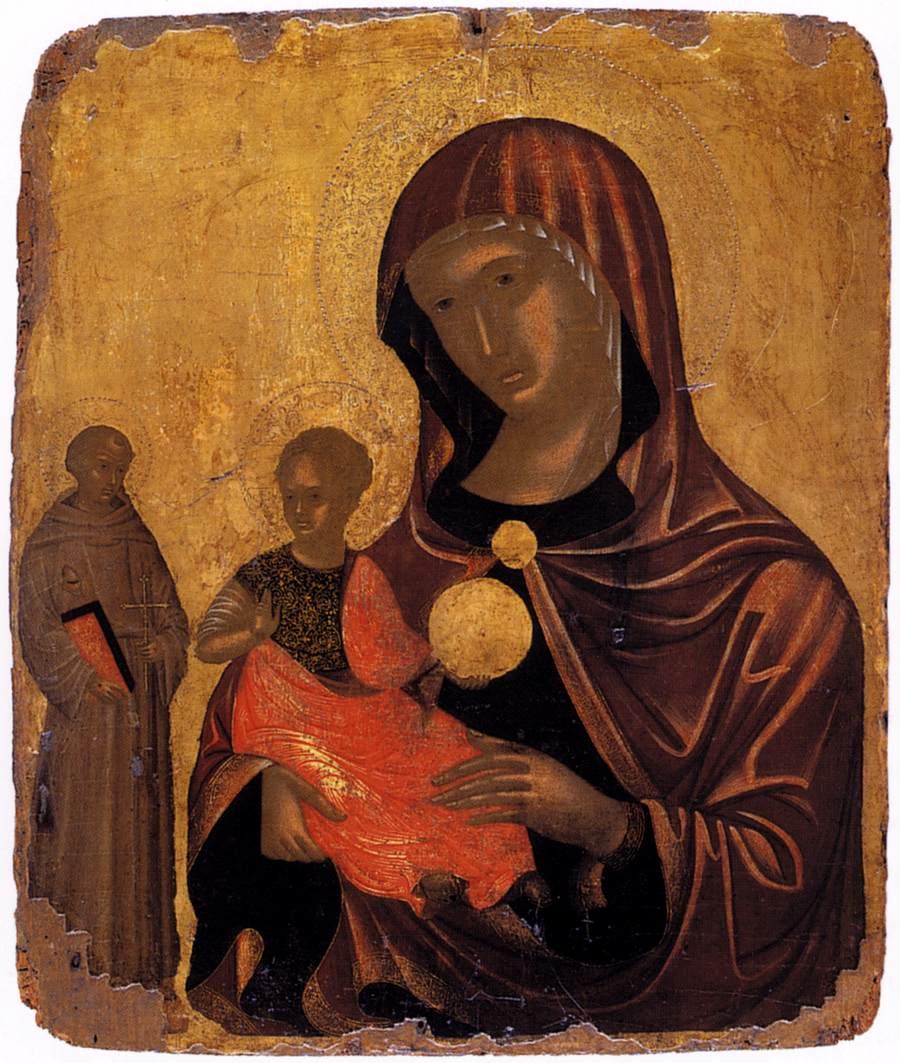
Virgin and Child Tzafouris
