= William Griggs (inventor) =

William Griggs (4 October 1832 – 7 December 1911) was an English inventor of a process of chromolithography known as photo-chromo-lithography. He was associated with the India Office, and publications for which he produced coloured illustrations include many works about India.

== Early life and career ==
Griggs was born in 1832, son of a lodge-keeper to the Duke of Bedford at Woburn, Bedfordshire. Losing his father in childhood, he was apprenticed at the age of twelve to the carpentering trade; aged 18 he was employed in London as an artisan in the Indian Court of the Great Exhibition of 1851. He improved his scanty education at night classes, and in 1855 was selected to be technical assistant to the reporter on Indian products and director of the India Museum, then in East India House, Leadenhall Street.

His artistic tastes and keen interest in photography were encouraged by Dr John Forbes Watson, who became his chief in 1858, and at his instance Griggs was installed at Fife House, Whitehall, pending completion of the India Office, in a studio and workshops for photolithographic work. He had familiarised himself with the processes of photozincography discovered by the director-general of the Ordnance Survey, General Sir Henry James.

=== Printing method ===
Griggs's reproduction of the Propaganda Map, the Vatican copy of the 1529 Spanish Padron Real.

By careful experiment he found that the use of cold, instead of hot, water in developing the transfer left the gelatine in the whites of the transfer, thus giving firmer adhesion to the stone and serving as a support to the fine lines. He also invented photo-chromo-lithography by first printing from a photolithographic transfer a faint impression on the paper to serve as a "key", separating the colours on duplicate negatives by varnishes, then photolithographing the dissected portions on stones, finally registering and printing each in its position and particiliar colour, with the texture, light and shade of the original.

He greatly cheapened the production of colour work by a simplified form of this discovery: a photolithographic transfer from a negative of the original to stone, printed as a "key" in a suitable colour, superimposing thereon, in exact register, transparent tints in harmony with the original. Opaque colours, when necessary, were printed first.

So far from keeping secret or patenting these improvements, Griggs described and gave practical demonstrations of them to the London Photographic Society (14 April 1868). He was thus a pioneer in the wide diffusion of colour work and halftone block-making, and helped to bring about rapid cylindrical printing.

== Productions ==
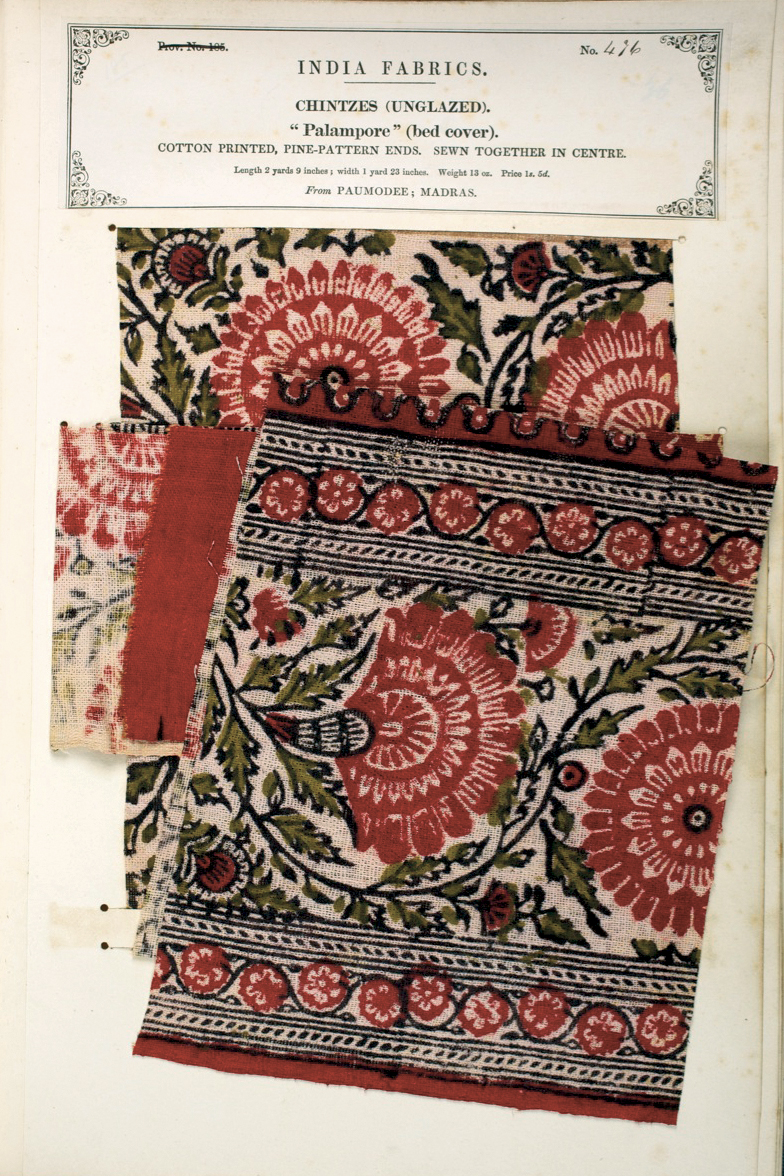
A page from The Textile Manufactures of India (1866) by John Forbes Watson

Griggs established photolithographic works at his Peckham residence in 1868, soon after the publication of his first notable achievement: the plates illustrating John Forbes Watson's The Textile Manufactures and the Costumes of the People of India (1866); this was followed by those illustrating Tree and Serpent Worship in India (1868), by James Fergusson.

He also reproduced some of the Prince Consort's drawings for Queen Victoria, and was thereafter chromolithographer to her Majesty and subsequently to King Edward VII. Though the contents of the India Museum were dispersed between South Kensington and elsewhere in 1878, he continued to serve the India Office until September 1885, afterwards devoting himself exclusively to his own business.

In reproductions of old manuscripts and letterpress texts Griggs was as successful as in chromolithography. His production of fifty copies of the "Mahābhāṣya" (the standard authority on Sanskrit grammar), consisting of 4674 pages (1871), was carried out for £6000 less than the estimate for a tracing of the original manuscript by hand. His Shakespeare quartos, with critical introductions by Frederick James Furnivall and others, in 43 volumes (1881–1891), were sold at 6 shillings each; the handtraced facsimiles by E. W. Ashbee had been sold at five guineas each.

On the initiative of Sir George Birdwood, who gave him constant encouragement, Griggs secured in 1881 the patronage of the committee of council on education for a series of shilling "Portfolios of Industrial Art", 200 of which had been issued by 1912, chiefly selected from the Chinese, Persian, Arabian, Sicilian, Italian, Russian, and Spanish specimens at the Victoria and Albert Museum.

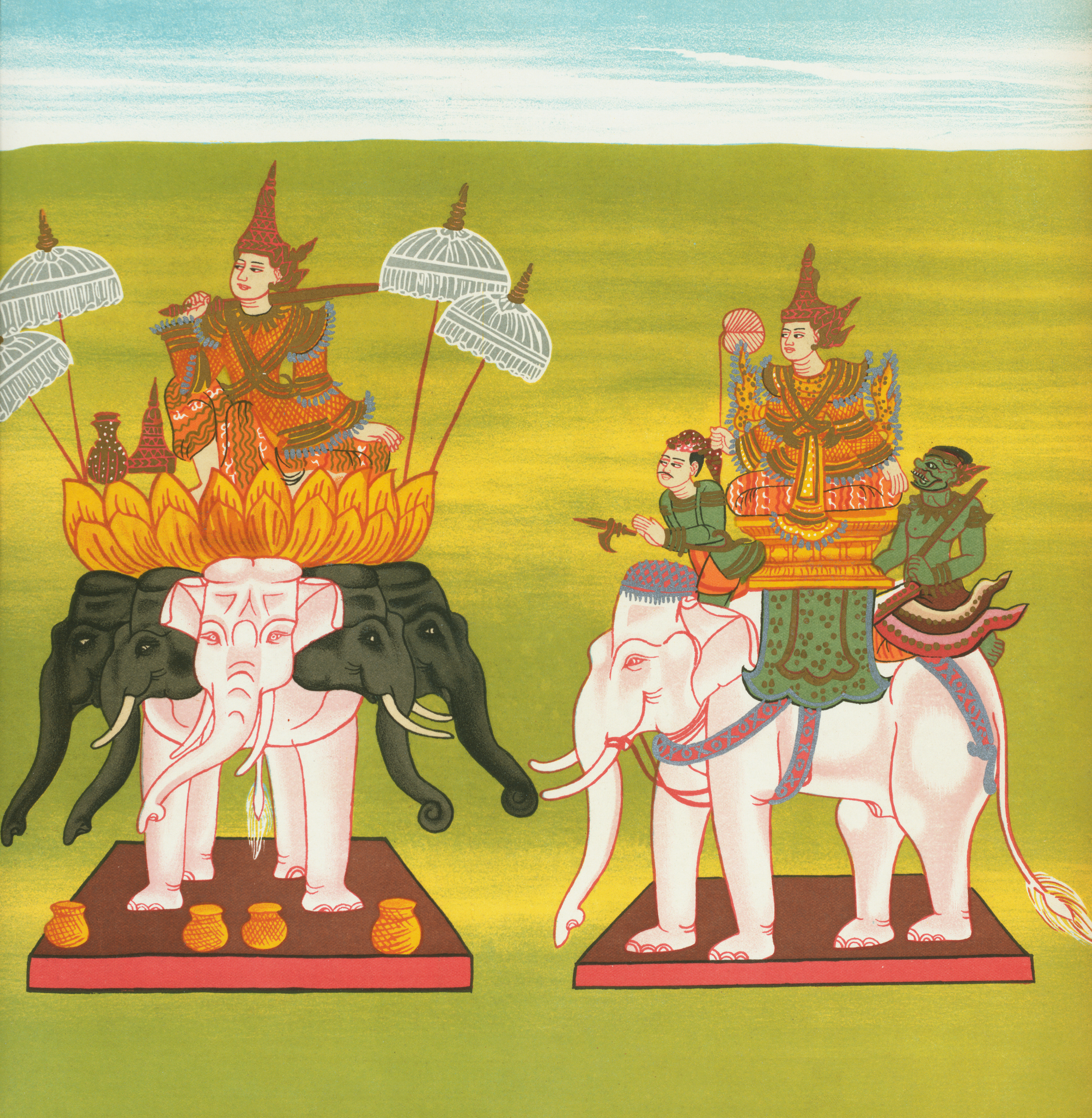
"Lord of Five White Elephants (Ngázíshin nat)" and "Lord of the White Elephant of Aung Pinl (Aungbinlè Sinbyushin nat)" from The Thirty-Seven Nats: a phase of spirit worship prevailing in Burma by Richard Carnac Temple (1906)

Under an arrangement with the government of India, also negotiated at Sir George's instance, he issued from January 1884 the quarterly Journal of Indian Art and Industry. A notable work in the same field, edited by Colonel T. H. Hendley, was his Asian Carpet Designs (1905) of 150 coloured plates. He was also successful in illustrating such works as Dr James Burgess's reports on the archaeology of Western India through a long series of years, and his Ancient Monuments of India (1897 to 1911); Colonel T. H. Hendley's many works on the art and history of Rajputana; facsimiles of illuminated manuscripts at the British Museum (1889–1903), and other works for the trustees; Richard Carnac Temple's The Thirty-Seven Nats (1906); and many scientific works, such as M. C. Cooke's Illustrations of British Fungi (2nd edition in 6 volumes, 1884–1888) and his Handbook thereof (2nd edition 1887).

== Family and later years ==
Griggs married in 1851 Elizabeth Jane Gill (died 1903), and in his later years was assisted in business by his two sons. The firm of W. Griggs & Sons was formed into a public company on 20 December 1906. He was for a time managing director, but owing to ill health resigned all connection with the company in January 1910.

He died in Worthing on 7 December 1911, and was buried in Forest Hill Cemetery in London. His second son, Walter, carried on an independent business on his father's lines.
