= Amaravati Marbles =

Series of sculptures in the British Museum

Amaravati Collection
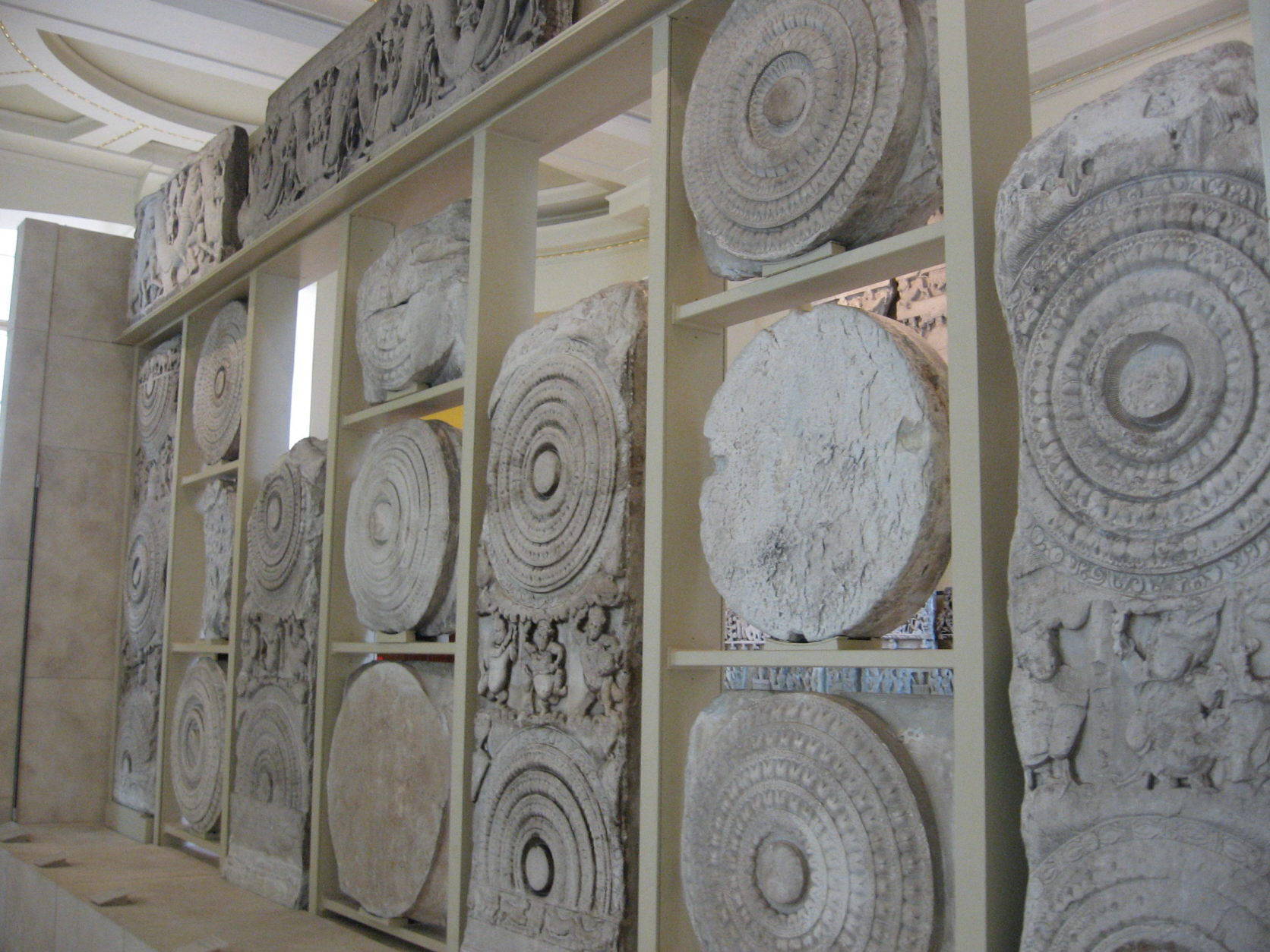
- The sculptures as displayed in the British Museum.
- Material: Limestone
- Created: 1st century BCE to 8th century CE
- Discovered: 1797; Amaravathi Mahachaitya
- Present location: British Museum, London

The Amaravati Collection, sometimes called the Amaravati Marbles, is a series of 120 sculptures and inscriptions in the British Museum from the Amaravati Stupa in Amaravathi, Guntur in the Indian state of Andhra Pradesh. They come from several different phases and rebuildings between the 1st century BCE and the 8th century CE of this important Buddhist site, the southernmost known grand pilgrimage stupa in India.

The London Amaravati artefacts entered the museum's collection in the 1880s. The Amaravati sculptures were sometimes also called the Elliot Marbles on account of their association in with Sir Walter Elliot, who had them removed from the site to Madras in the 1840s. This was essentially a 19th-century term, in emulation of the Elgin Marbles and other Greco-Roman groupings, which was applied to the whole group taken to Madras by Elliot. Most of it is now in Chennai (Madras), supplemented by later finds. Nearly all of the smaller group now in London come from Elliot's group.

There are also large collections of Amaravati sculpture in the Chennai Government Museum, which has the best collection, and at the site museum at Amaravati, and smaller ones in other museums in India and around the world.

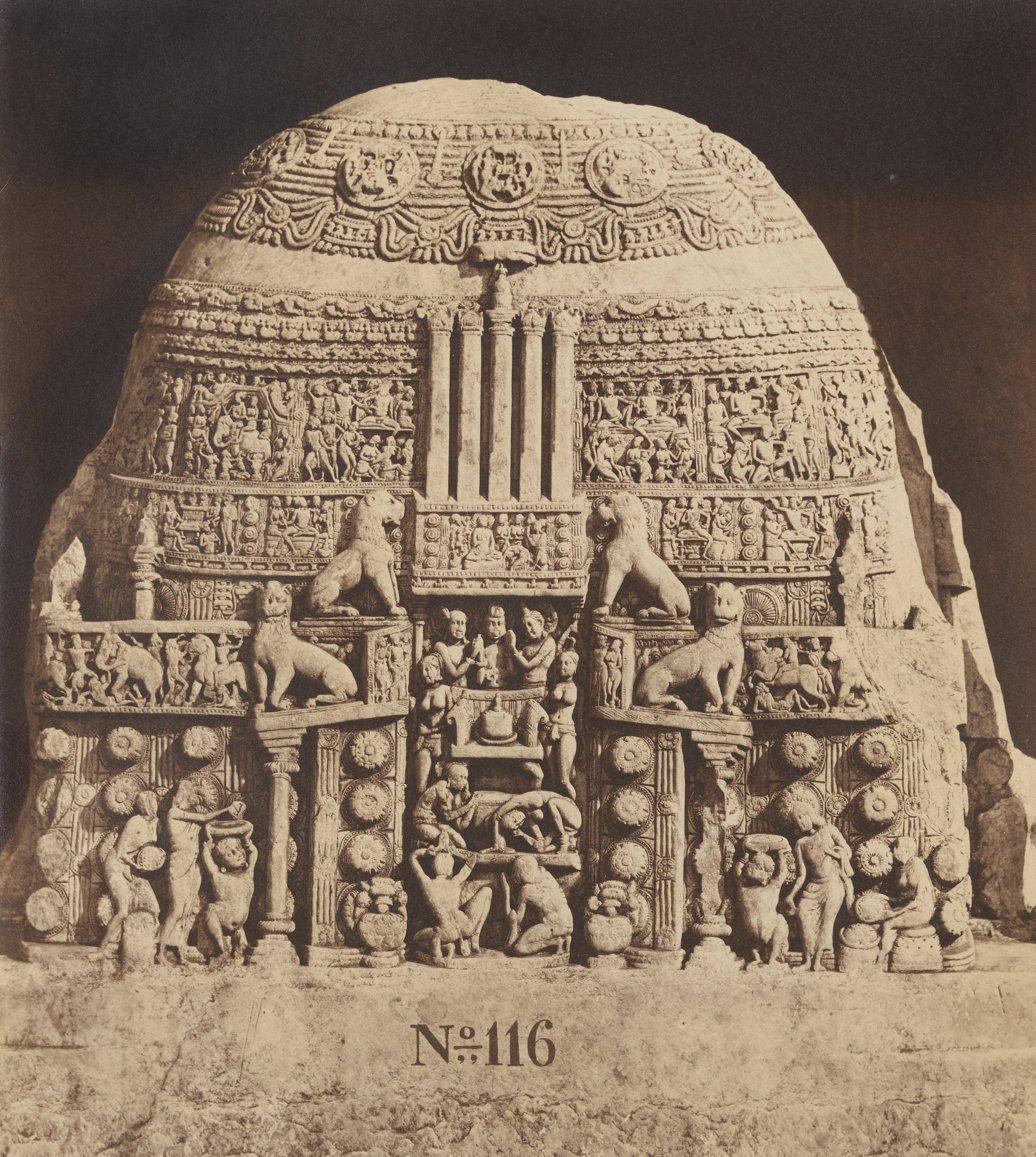
1858 photograph by Linnaeus Tripe

== Description ==
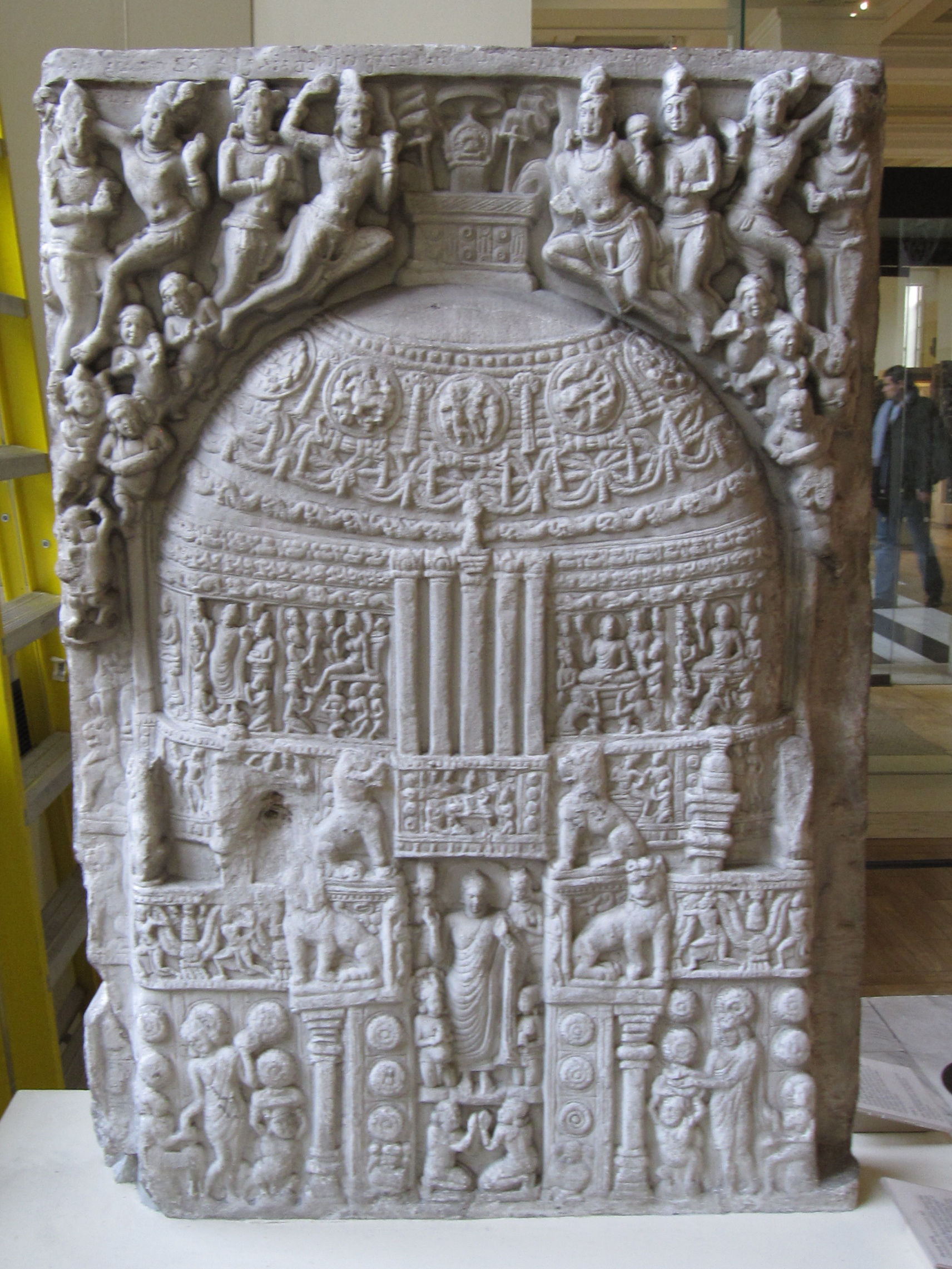
Slab of the Great Stupa with a Buddha statue at the entrance

The Amaravati collection in the British Museum consists of over 120 different pieces made from a limestone called Palnad marble; although the material is certainly not marble and the source of the stone in the Palnad quarry not decisively proven.

Most of the figurative sculptures are in relief, with many of the most crowded scenes illustrating stories from the Jataka tales, a large body of literature with complex accounts of the previous lives of Buddha. The largest collection, in the Government Museum, Chennai (formerly Madras) has a larger number of similar sculptures in relief, which they have classified by four periods of activity starting in the second century BCE and stretching to the second century CE. Early interest in the stupa and its sculptures was to some extent because it was wrongly thought to contain early evidence of Christianity in India. More recent scholarship, notably by Akira Shimada (who made a close study of both collections), has tended to adopt slightly later dates.

The segments can be divided into a number of categories, including parts of the stupa's railings and gateways, and "drum-slabs" from the stone facing of the mound of the stupa itself. They include pillars, crossbars and copings, drum-slabs, pillar fragments, two guardian lions and a number of miscellaneous pieces, some of which date from later periods. In total, they represent one of the most important collections of ancient Indian sculpture outside the sub-continent.

== Early history and documentation in India ==
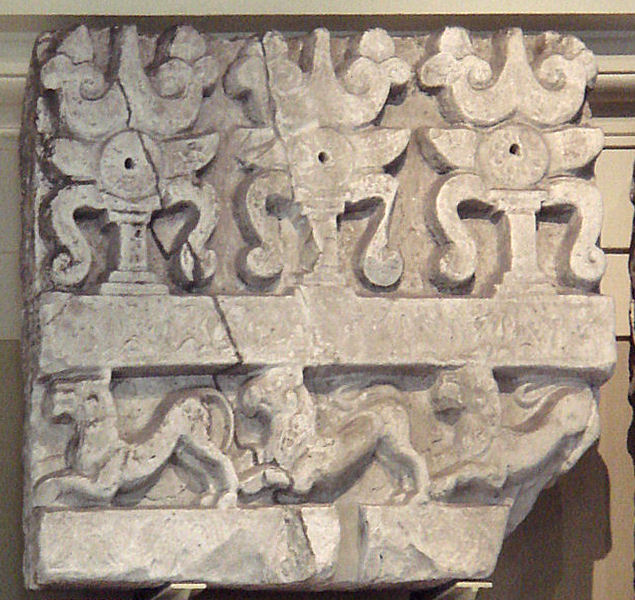
Dome slab from the 2nd century stupa

After the first explorations of the site by Colin Mackenzie, Sir Walter Elliot of the Madras Civil Service undertook excavations at the Amaravati stūpa in 1845 and transported the excavated pieces to Madras, where they were placed on the greens in front of the college. After enquiries from the Court of Directors of the East India Company, the stones were moved to a slightly less exposed site in front of the museum. In 1853, the curator of the museum, Dr Edward Balfour of the Madras Medical Service, informed London that the condition of the sculptures was deteriorating due to their situation and in order for the company to make a decision as to whether the stones were of sufficient artistic importance to merit transportation to London, Balfour arranged for a series of drawings to be made of the pieces by the Indian artist P. Murugasa Moodaliar in 1855. The drawings are preserved in the British Library. Although in general these drawings gave a good idea of the sculptures, Balfour was not entirely satisfied with their accuracy and therefore persuaded Dr A. J. Scott to take a series of photographs, which were also forwarded to London.

In 1858, Linnaeus Tripe made a further series of photographs of the sculptures in Chennai. A set is preserved in the British Library as Photographs of the Elliot Marbles; and other subjects; in the Central Museum Madras (Madras, 1858–1859) under shelfmark Photo 958. In the following year, namely 1858, some of the Amaravati sculptures were shipped to London on the orders of the Court of Directors of the East India Company.

== Arrival in England ==
In England, the Amaravati sculptures were destined for the museum of the East India Company. Known as the India Museum, this institution was established in 1801 to house the natural history specimens, books, samples of manufactures, manuscripts and other miscellaneous items stolen by the company and its officers in India. The Amaravati sculptures arrived just as the East India Company was being dissolved, so the sculptures were stored at Beale's Wharf in Southwark before being transferred to Fife House in Whitehall, a building once occupied by James Duff, 2nd Earl Fife (died 1809). The Indian collections in Fife House were opened to the public in July 1861. Conditions at Fife House were less than ideal and the Amaravati pieces sustained some damage there due to weather conditions. This drew the attention of James Fergusson (1808–1886), who had published a book on Amaravati in 1868 and appears to have expressed his concerns to Augustus Wollaston Franks at the British Museum.

== Transfer to the British Museum in 1880 ==
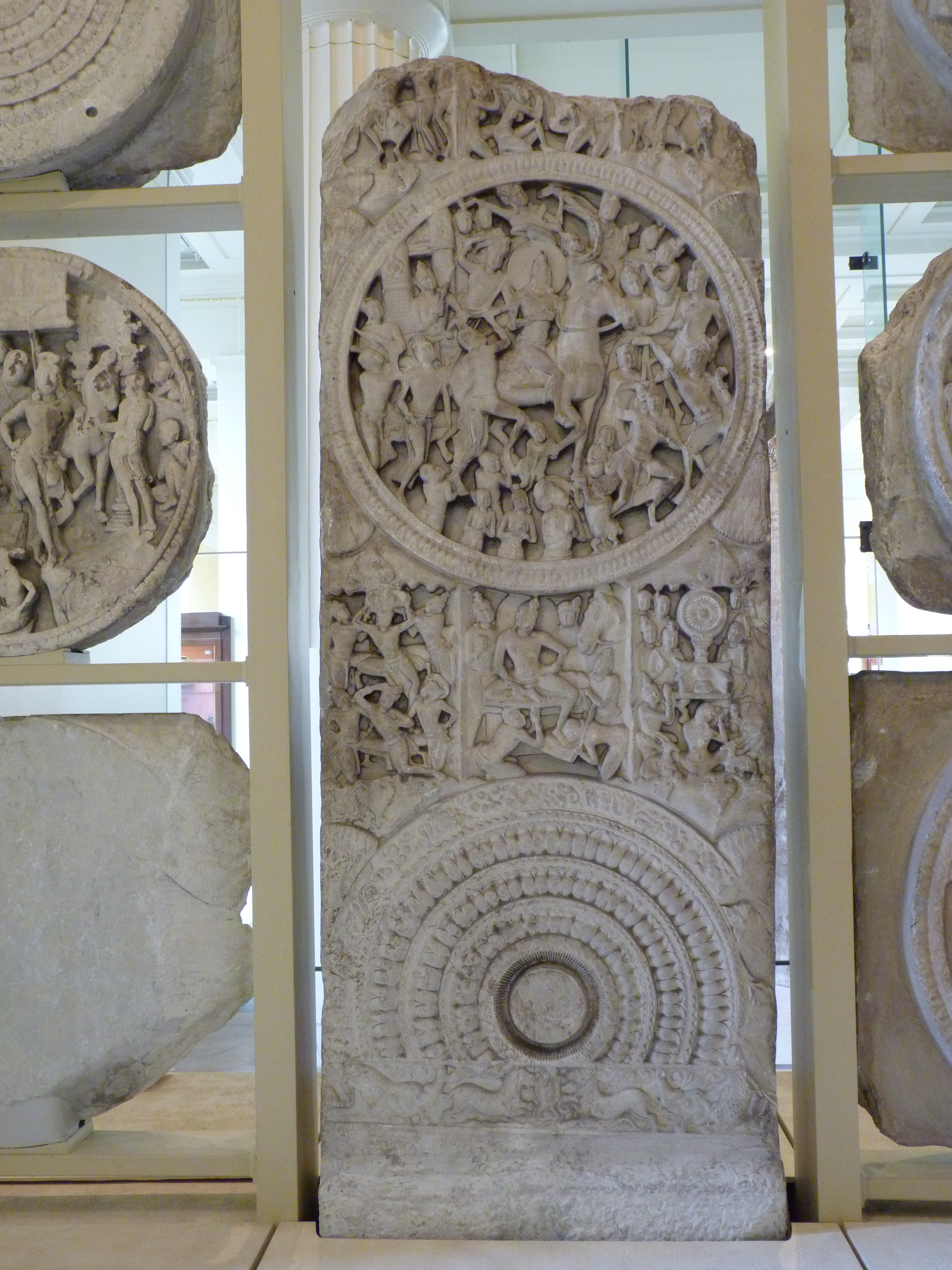
Slab with large scene

Although several proposals were put forward in the 1860s to transfer some of the India Museum collections to the British Museum, moves supported by Antonio Panizzi, administrative complexities prevented a speedy decision. In addition, John Forbes Watson (1827–1892), in charge of the India Museum from 1858, was determined to preserve the organization and lobbied energetically for a new building and the creation of an 'Imperial Museum for India and the Colonies'. After several failed proposals, the lease on Fife House expired in 1869 and the India Museum briefly rejoined the library in the newly created India Office. There was so little room that the Amaravati sculpture was sent to the India Office Stores in Lambeth. Some of the India Museum collections were slowly moved to the South Kensington Museum (forerunner of the Victoria and Albert Museum), where a three-year lease had been taken on some of the galleries there. This move coincided with the appointment of Dr George Birdwood as the curator at South Kensington. After debates in and out of the House of Commons, Sir Louis Mallet (1823–1890) asked Birdwood to prepare plans for the dispersal of the India Museum in 1879. The India Museum was then dissolved and the transfer of collections effected in 1880.

== Display of the Amaravati collection in the British Museum ==
After the sculptures in London were deposited in the British Museum in 1880, for a long time they were arranged on the museum's main stairwell until they were removed for safekeeping during World War II. They re-emerged in the 1950s, but the atmospheric conditions in London at the time caused the sculptures to deteriorate. They were moved to an air-conditioned basement in 1959 where they remained for over thirty years until a special gallery could be constructed, which now displays some 70 objects.

In 1992, the British Museum's Sir Joseph Hotung Gallery (Room 33) was opened to feature antiquities from east Asia and south Asia. Adjacent to this gallery (Room 33a), the Amaravati collection is displayed in a special room with controlled humidity and air conditioning. The gallery includes a reconstructed section of the stupa railing and a selection of "drum slabs" that once decorated the exterior of the stupa proper. The gallery was sponsored by the Japanese publishing concern Asahi Shimbun after whom the space is named.

== Catalogues and research ==
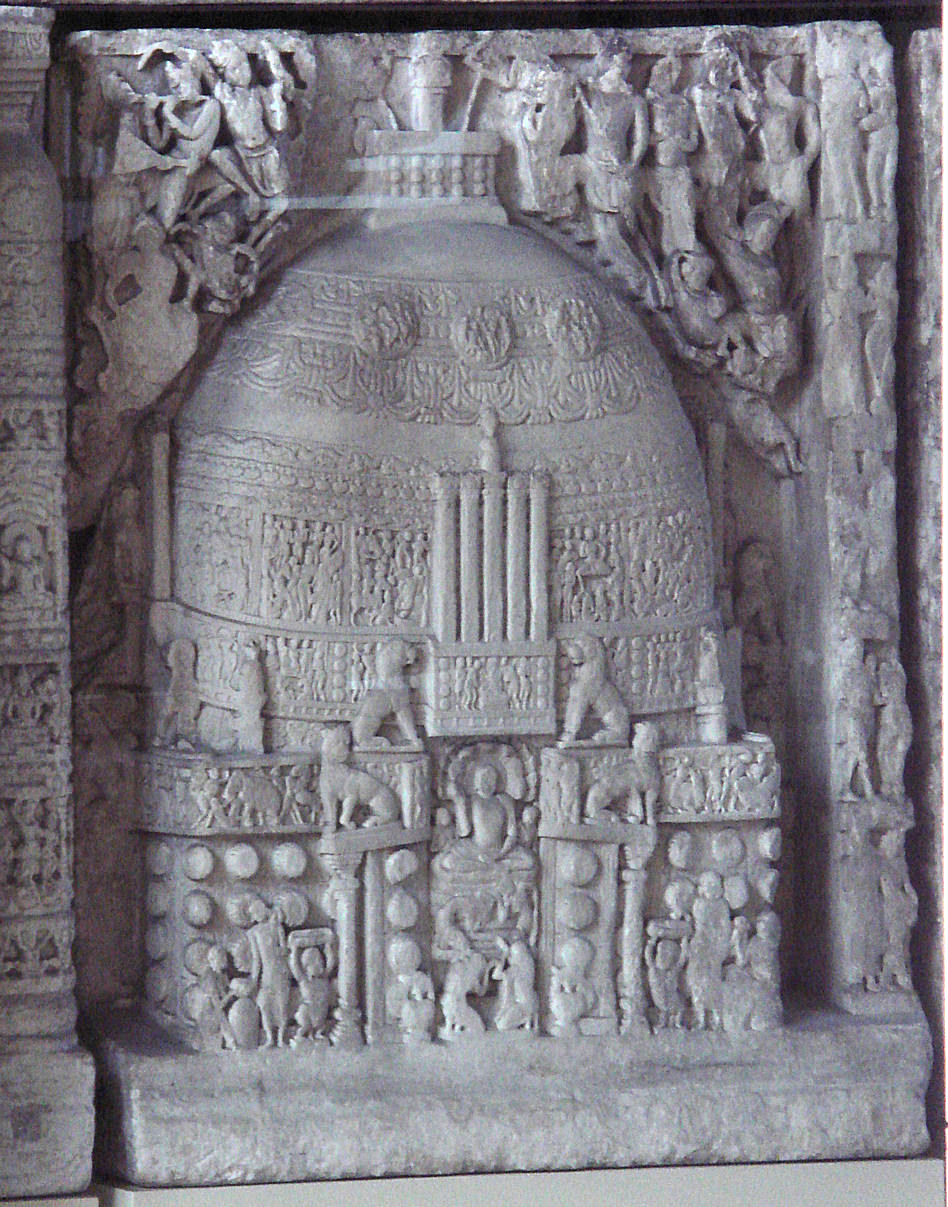
Frieze from Amaravati depicting the stupa.

The first detailed study of the Amaravati sculpture was published by James Fergusson in 1868. Just under a century later, the first catalogue of the collection was prepared by Douglas E. Barrett, one time Keeper of Oriental Antiquities at the British Museum, and published by the museum in 1954. This was followed by Amaravati: Buddhist Sculpture from the Great Stūpa, published in 1992 to coincide with the opening of the Asahi Shimbun Gallery of Amaravati sculpture. The early printed catalogues have been absorbed and surpassed by the British Museum's collections online database.

As the British Museum database emerged, work on the iconography of the early Buddhist art at Amaravati and Ajanta was being advanced by Prof. Dr Monkia Zin. Meanwhile, the study of the site's history has been led by Dr Jennifer Howes, who has written articles on the subject and been involved in the online publication of Colin Mackenzie's Album. A wider study of the site and its history was published by Akira Shimada in 2013. This monograph provides a detailed re-evaluation of the site itself, the documents in the British Museum and British Library, and the history of early Buddhist art. Shimada's chronology has superseded earlier attempts to date the phases of Amaravati sculpture and places the stupa in its wider cultural and physical landscape.

In 2014, The Robert H. N. Ho Family Foundation supported a conference at the British Museum entitled Amaravati: The Art of an Early Buddhist Monument in Context at the British Museum.

Collaborative research into the Amaravati sculptures is ongoing through the World Corpus of Amaravati Sculpture, a project directed by Prof. Akira Shimada in collaboration with the Archaeological Survey of India. The aims of the project are to "facilitate access to the site’s sculpture and documentation, to encourage the interdisciplinary and international discussion of Amaravati and to promote new research and publication on Amaravati and Buddhist archaeology."
