= James Waterhouse (photographer) =

English photographer

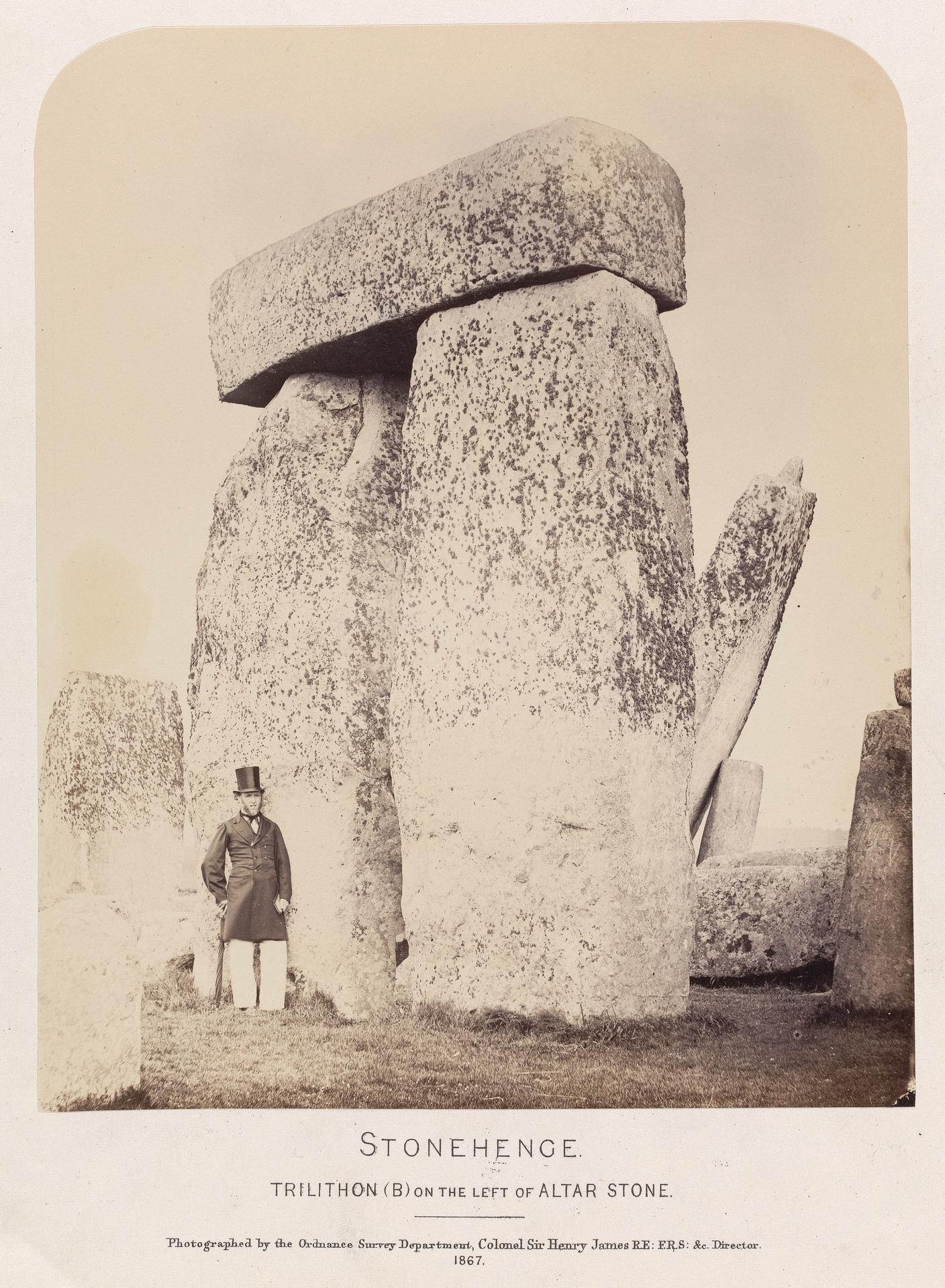
James Waterhouse - Stonehenge, Trilithon (On the left of altar stone), Yale Center for British Art

James Waterhouse (1842–1922) was an English photographer and Indian Army officer who headed the Photographic Department of the Survey of India and pioneered the development of photomechanical printing.

== Early life ==
James Waterhouse was born in London on 24 July 1842, the son of William Waterhouse, solicitor and his wife Mary. He was educated at King's College and University College schools, London, before applying at the age of 17 years for a cadetship in the Bengal Artillery of the army of the East India Company. From 1857-1859 he attended the Company's military seminary at Addiscombe, near Croydon, before sailing for India, where he arrived in October 1859.

== Photography in India ==
Waterhouse may well have first learnt photography during his time at Addiscombe, where the subject had formed part of the curriculum since the mid-1850s and while stationed in Meerut in 1859 he acquired his first camera, 'a half-plate set made of the good old French walnut wood ... [which] ... stood the hot dry climate wonderfully well'. His first serious photographic expedition appears to have been made in 1861 in the company of a fellow officer, Boyce Edward Gowan, with whom he made the first recorded photographs of the ruined Buddhist stupa and monastery at Sanchi, near the holy Hindu city of Vidisha. In June 1861, an official circular issued under the authority of the Governor-General Lord Canning, was sent out encouraging military officers and others to collect photographs of ethnic and tribal types and in December 1861 Waterhouse was officially seconded to undertake a photographic tour of Central India (present-day Madhya Pradesh) for this purpose. This work occupied him for the whole of 1862 and involved a series of strenuous trips in Central India in search of suitable subjects: the best-known of this work is the series of portraits made of Sikandar Begum of Bhopal, her family and courtiers, taken in November of that year. A selection of these portraits was later included in John Forbes Watson and John William Kaye, The People of India (8 vols., India Museum, London, 1868–75), while views taken at Sanchi during the trip were used by the architectural historian James Fergusson in his Tree and Serpent Worship (India Museum, London, 1868).

== The Survey of India ==
In May 1866 Waterhouse was appointed Assistant Surveyor in charge of the photozincographic operations of the Survey of India and after undergoing training at Dehradun in the use of photozincography for the reproduction of maps and plans, he arrived in Calcutta in December 1866 to take up his new post. The remaining thirty years of his career were to be spent in supervising the photographic operations of the Calcutta headquarters, overseeing a dramatic growth in the department's output and activities, from a minor and ill-housed offshoot of the Survey of India to one of its most important departments, housed in the impressive quarters which survive to the present day in Wood Street. As well as printing maps and plans, the Photolithographic Department of the Survey undertook a wide range of additional photographic activities under Waterhouse's direction, including the copying of the sketches made by Edward Law Durand in the course of his work with the Afghan Boundary Commission of 1884-87, the producing of presentation albums for the Viceroy relating to the Gilgit Mission of 1888 and the reproduction of photographs made by the Archaeological Survey of India.

== Later career and death ==
He retired from the Photography Section of the Surveyor-General's Office in Calcutta in 1897 after 31 years, at the age of 55, moving to Hurstmead, Eltham. Kent. In his later career, Waterhouse was Honorary President of the Calcutta Zoological Gardens from 1894-1897, president of the Asiatic Society of Bengal from 1888-1890, and trustees and twice chairman of the Indian Museum in Calcutta. He was president of the Photographic Society of India and the Royal Photographic Society between 1905-1907. He was made an Honorary Fellow of the RPS in 1905 and was awarded its Progress Medal in 1891 for his researches and work in orthochromatic photography and photographic etching. and the Voigtländer Medal of the Vienna Photographic Society. He died on 28 September 1922, aged 80 years.
