= Theodore Jacobsen =

English merchant and architect

Portrait of Theodore Jacobsen by Thomas Hudson, 1746

Theodore Jacobsen (died 1772) was an English merchant in London, known also as an architect.

== Life ==
Jacobsen was a merchant in Basinghall Street, London. He was the London-born son of Sir Jacob Jacobsen, a north German merchant, of a family closely involved with the Hanseatic League, and their London base, the Steelyard. From 1735 Jacobsen ran the family business there.

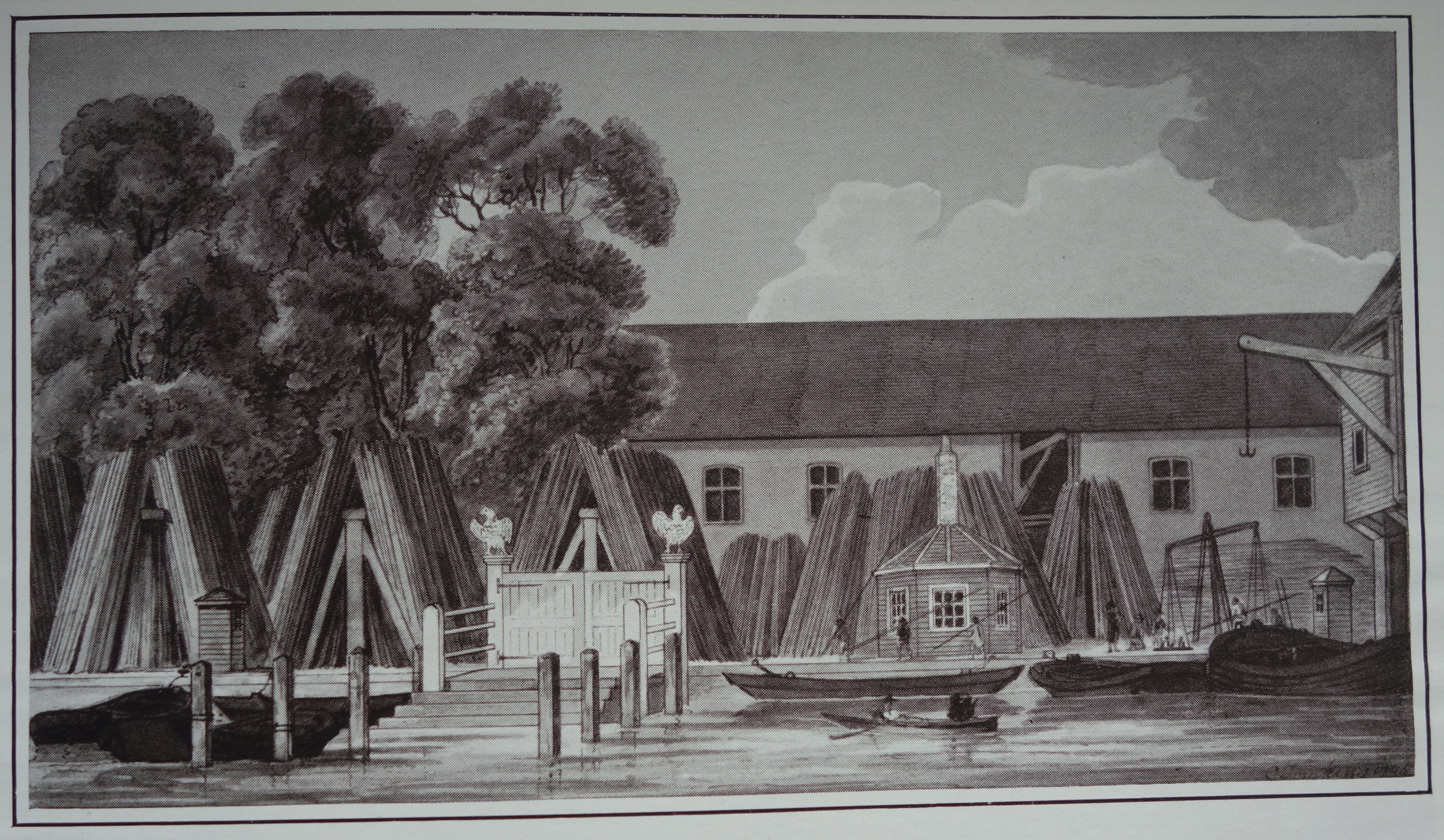
The Steelyard, the headquarters in London of the Hanseatic League

In the period 1726–9 Jacobsen rebuilt East India House in the Doric order, which took on the form it presented for the rest of the 18th century. The work was carried out under John James. The House was then reconstructed in the late 1790s, to a plan by Richard Jupp. In 1731 Jacobsen was unsuccessful in submitting a plan to the Bank of England, for building work that was carried out to a design by George Sampson.

Jacobsen designed the Foundling Hospital; the plan was approved in 1742, and was carried out under James Horne as surveyor. Jacobsen became a governor of the hospital. After a falling-out with Jacobsen in 1742, Thomas Coram, the hospital's founder, failed to be re-elected to its General Committee. Henry Keene did further work on the Foundling Hospital site, under Jacobsen's supervision. Jacobsen also designed the Royal Hospital Haslar. His plans for Trinity College, Dublin's West Front and Parliament Square were carried out in the 1750s by Henry Keene and John Sanderson (died 1774) with Hugh Darley acting as superintendent.

Jacobsen became a Fellow of the Royal Society, the Society of Antiquaries of London, and the Society of Arts. He died on 25 May 1772, and was buried in All Hallows Church, Thames Street, London. He did not marry.

== Works ==
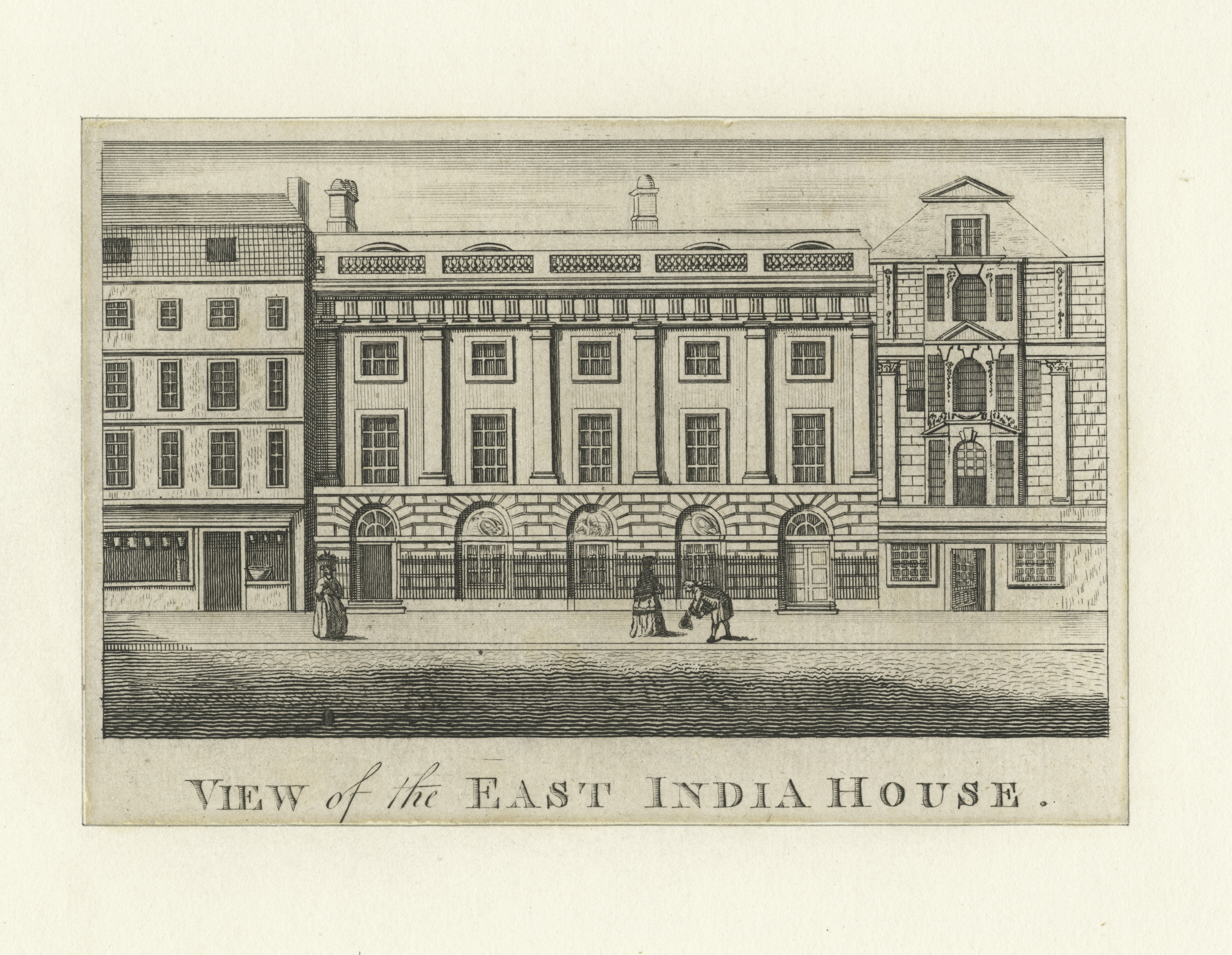

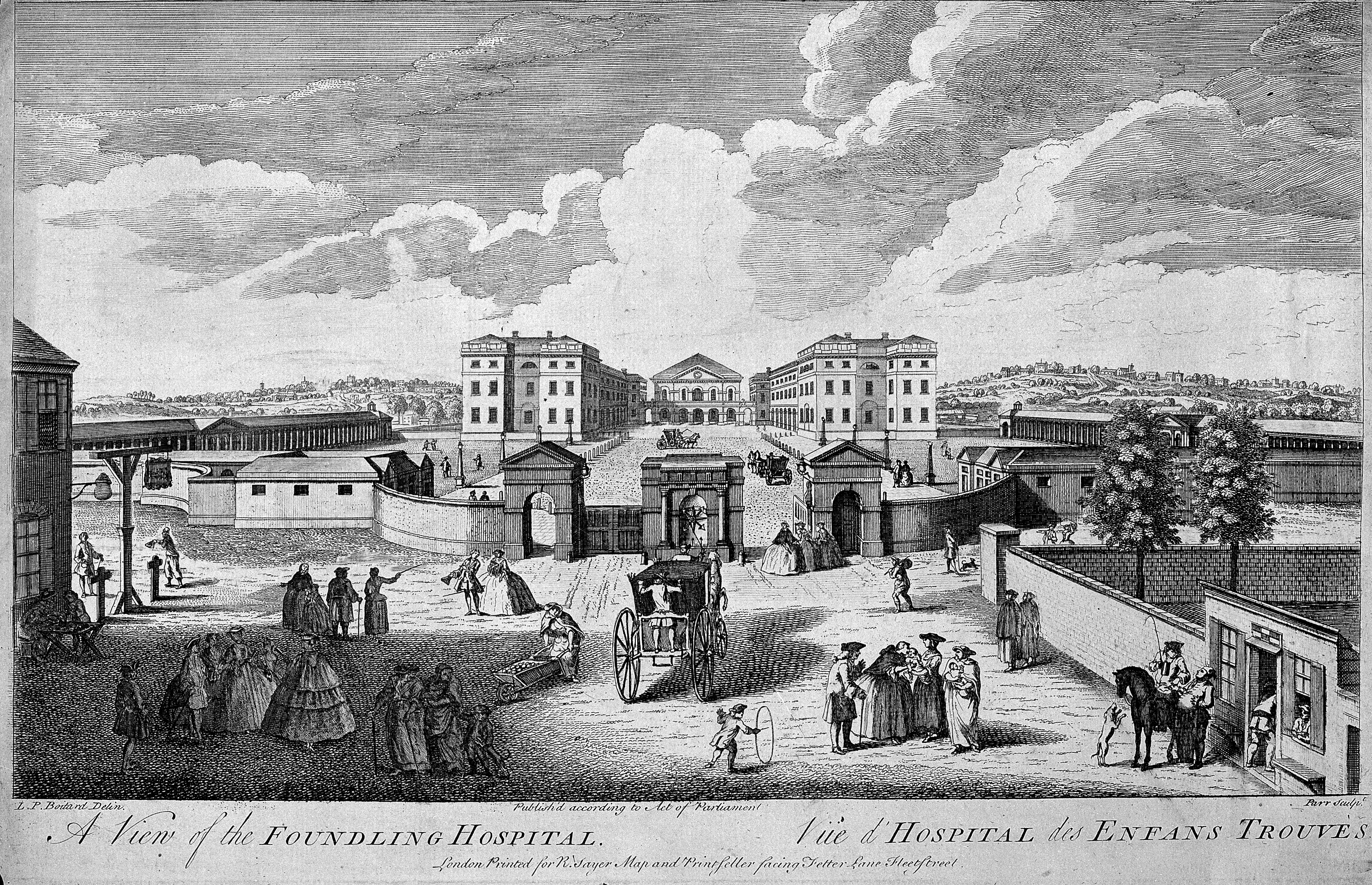

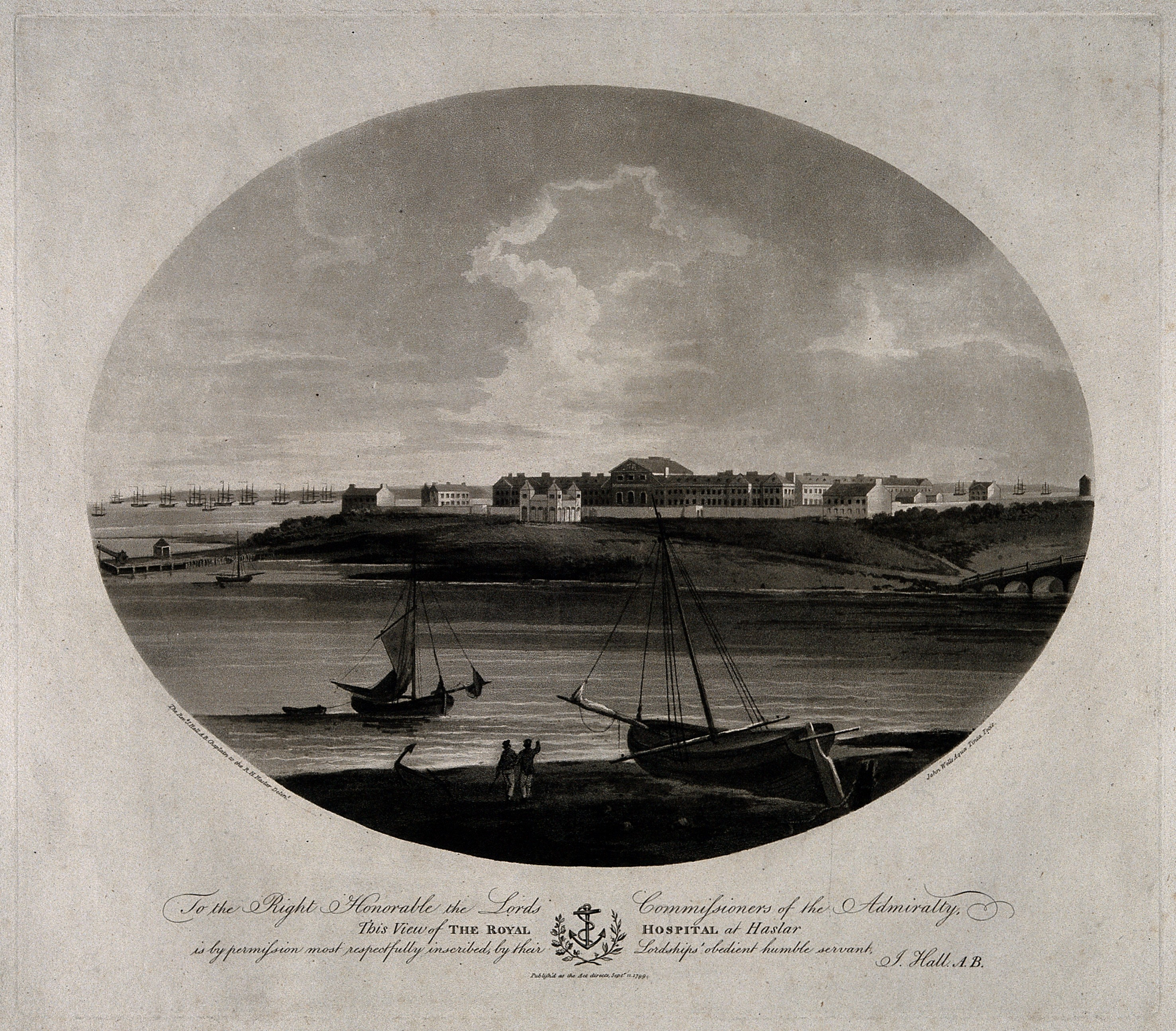

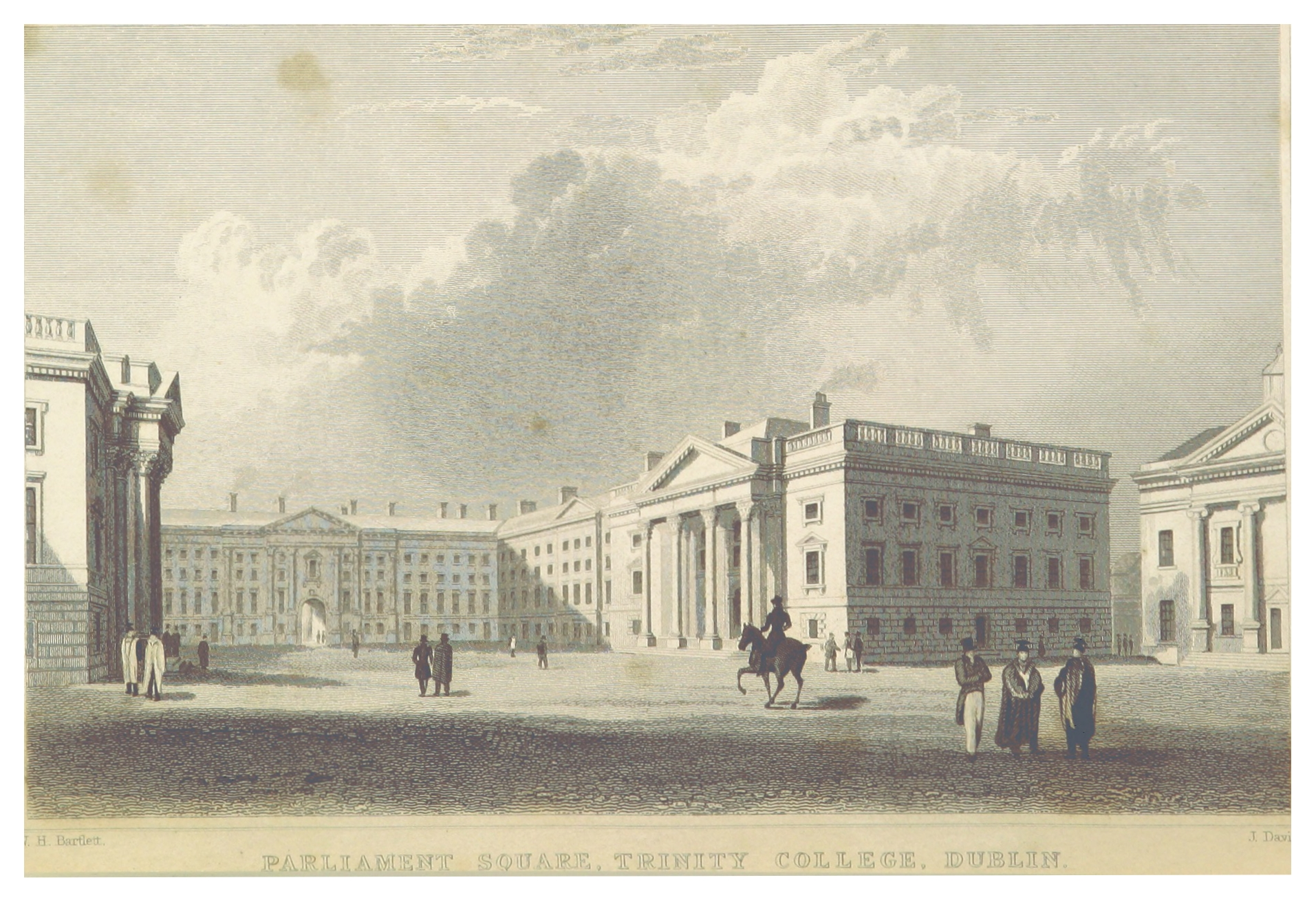

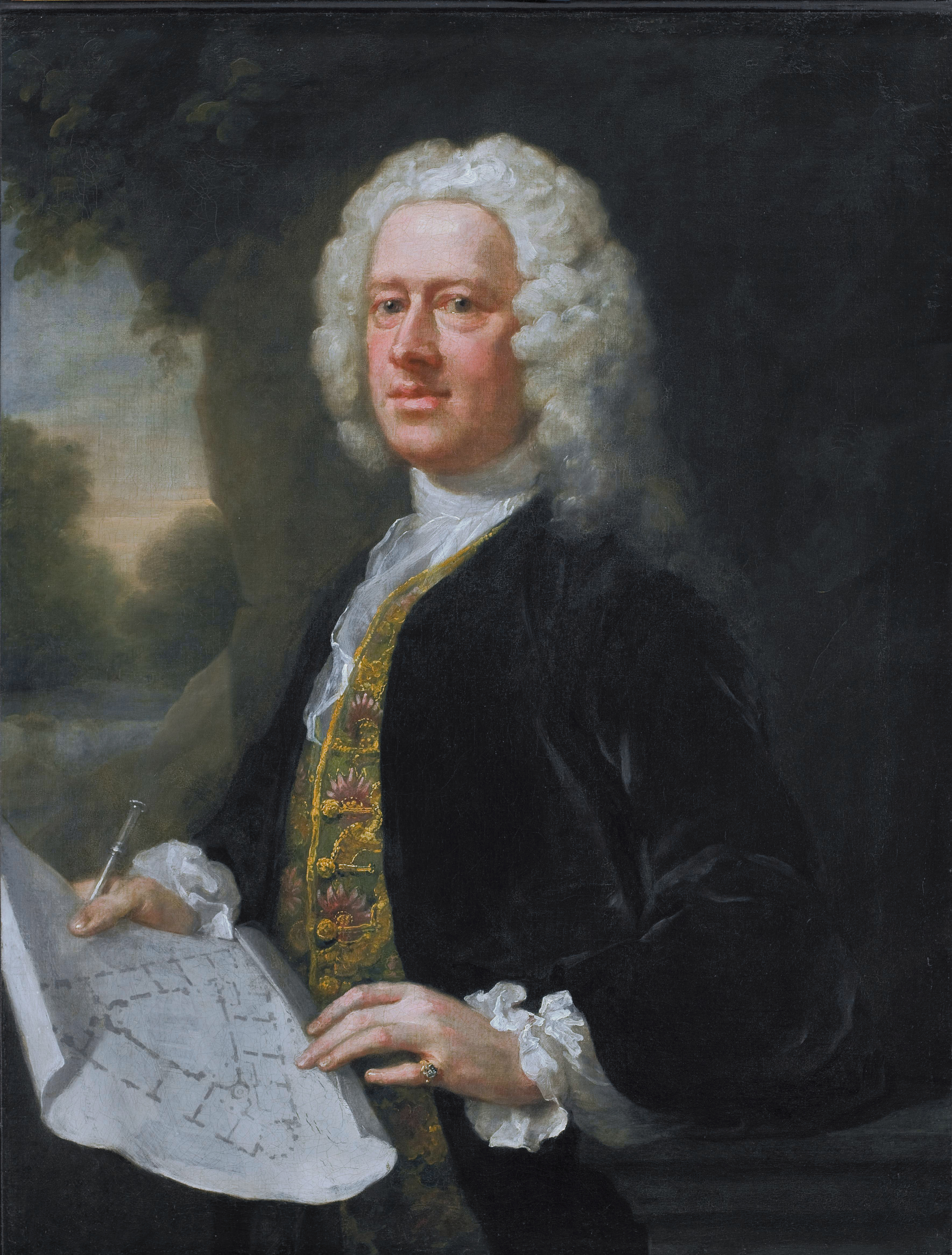
Portrait of Theodore Jacobsen by William Hogarth, 1742
