= Painshill House =

House in Surrey, South East England

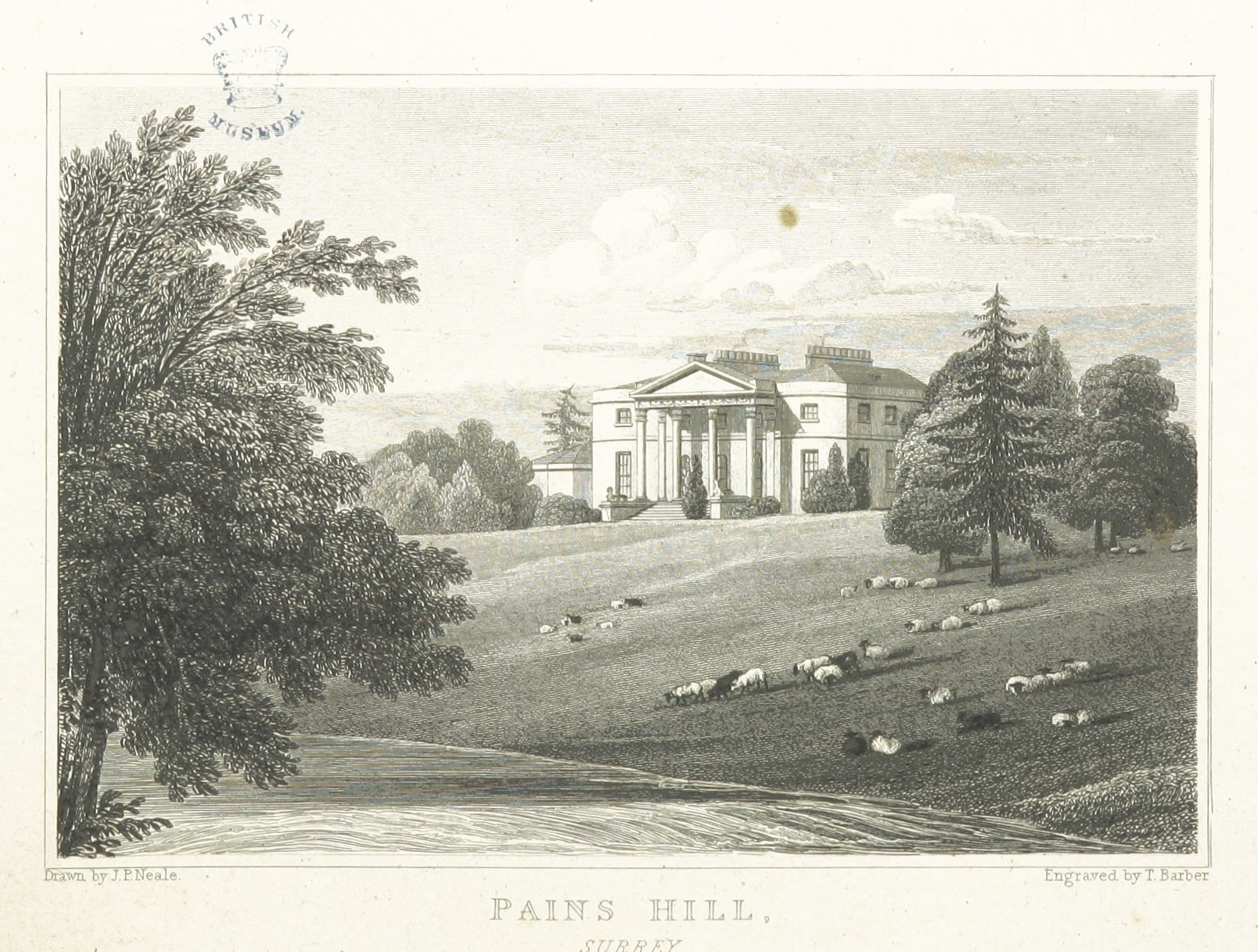
- Painshill House in 1824 by John Preston Neale

- Location within Surrey
- 51°19′55″N 0°25′35″W
- Type: Country house
- Location: Cobham, Surrey

History
- Built: 1778

Site notes
- Elevation: 32 metres (105 ft)
- Architect: Richard Jupp

Listed Building – Grade II*
- Official name: Painshill House
- Designated: 17 March 1982
- Reference no.: 1030132

Painshill House is a Grade II*-listed house in Cobham, Surrey, England. It was designed by Richard Jupp in the late 1770s for Benjamin Bond Hopkins. Subsequent alterations were undertaken by Decimus Burton and Norman Shaw.

Until the Second World War, Painshill House was the residence for the owner of the adjacent Painshill landscape gardens, created in the 18th century by Charles Hamilton. In the late 1940s, the estate was split into lots and sold to separate owners. The house was also divided into five individual dwellings.

== History ==
At the start of the 18th century, the future Painshill estate was divided between land leased from the Crown by Robert Gavell and a freehold property owned by the Smyther family. Gabriel, Marquis du Quesne, bought the Smythers' land in around 1717, by which time it consisted of two or three farms. Du Quesne is thought to have built the first mansion house, designed in the style of John Vanbrugh and laid out a small formal park. In 1720, Du Quesne was ruined as a result of the collapse of the South Sea Company and he sold Painshill to William Bellamy in 1725. Bellamy, a barrister at the Inner Temple, also started to lease the land owned by the Crown, which had become available following the death of Gavell in 1724.

Charles Hamilton began to acquire property at Painshill in 1737, purchasing William Bellamy's freehold and lease from the Crown, and adding additional land to create an estate of more than 200 acres (81 ha). (Note: It is possible that Charles Hamilton was familiar with the area around Painshill through his friendship with the Fox family, who owned the nearby Downe Place, known later as Cobham Park.) He moved to Painshill in 1738 and began to create the park shortly afterwards.

Although Hamilton had received an income while working as Clerk Comptroller to Frederick, Prince of Wales, between 1738 and 1747, he borrowed heavily to finance the work at Painshill. The repayment of these loans became due in 1773 and Hamilton was forced to sell the estate to Benjamin Bond Hopkins. (Note: Charles Hamilton moved to Bath, Somerset after selling Painshill in 1773. He died there on 11 September 1786 and was buried in Bath Abbey.) In around 1778, Bond Hopkins commissioned Richard Jupp to build the current Painshill House to the south-east of Hamilton's residence, which became the site of the stables. Bond Hopkins died in 1794 and, three years later, the trustees of his estate sold Painshill to Robert Hibbert, a merchant.

William Moffat purchased Painshill from Robert Hibbert in around 1801. Moffat sold the estate in 1805 to Henry Luttrell, 2nd Earl of Carhampton, who moved to the property from Cobham Park. He died in 1821, but his widow continued to live at Painshill until her death in 1831, when it was sold to William Cooper.

Cooper commissioned Decimus Burton to make alterations to Painshill House, reconfiguring the interior, so that the east-facing portico became the main entrance. Cooper died in 1840, but his widow, Harriet, continued to live at Painshill until her death in 1863. The next owner was Charles Leaf, who bought the property nine years later and commissioned Norman Shaw to make alterations to the service wing. Leaf, who sold the estate to Alexander Cushney in 1887, was responsible for renting Painshill Cottage to Matthew Arnold from 1873. Arnold lived in the cottage until his death in 1888.

Alexander Cushney died in 1903, but his widow, Alice, remained at Painshill and married Charles Combe, who owned Cobham Court. The Combes were responsible for starting a commercial timber plantation on the estate. Charles Combe died in 1920, but Alice Combe continued to live at Painshill until the start of the Second World War, when the park was requisitioned for the use of the Canadian Army. In 1948, 236 acres (96 ha) of Painshill were purchased from the trustees of the Combe estate by the Baroness de Veauce, who split the land into lots and sold it to separate purchasers. The house was also divided into five individual dwellings, and was Grade II* listed in March 1982.

== Description ==
The two-storey Painshill House was built in the late 1770s for Benjamin Bond Hopkins. The west-facing main entrance, as designed by Richard Jupp, was via a portico with four Corinthian columns. This portico had been removed by the end of the 19th century and was replaced by a small wooden verandah, in turn replaced around 1925 by the portico from the Temple of Bacchus in the park. The external walls of the house are rendered and painted white, and the roof is covered in slate.

The oval drawing room, accessed directly from the Adam-style entrance lobby, was redecorated by Decimus Burton and its chimneypiece is attributed to John Flaxman. A vaulted hallway leads to the saloon on the eastern side of the house. Originally there were two staircases leading from this passage, but one was removed to provide space for a ground-floor kitchen and a first-floor bedroom. The saloon contains a marble chimneypiece that was probably installed by Jupp, but the frieze, which features scenes from Greek mythology, was added by Burton.

The Belfry House and Stable Cottage formerly comprised the stable block, which was built on the site of the original mansion in the early 19th century. It features a square clock tower, topped by a cupola. It was divided into two separate dwellings and is Grade II listed.

The lodges, either side of the entrance driveway, were built around 1800 and are Grade II listed.

== Notable residents ==
- Charles Hamilton
- Robert Hibbert
- William Moffat
- Henry Luttrell, 2nd Earl of Carhampton
- Felix Aylmer

== Bibliography ==
- Arnold, Matthew (1895). Russell, George W. E. (ed.). Letters of Matthew Arnold 1848–1888. Vol. II. London: Macmillan. OCLC 1247643292.
- O'Brien, Charles; Nairn, Ian; Cherry, Bridget; Pevsner, Nikolaus (2022) [1962]. Surrey. The Buildings of England. London: Yale University Press. ISBN 978-0-30-023478-7.
- Symes, Michael (2010). Mr Hamilton's Elysium: The Gardens of Painshill. London: Frances Lincoln. ISBN 978-0-71-123055-2.
- Taylor, David C. (2003). Cobham: A History. Chichester: Philimore. ISBN 978-1-86-077247-4.
- Taylor, David C. (2006). An Estate for All Seasons : A History of Cobham Park, Surrey and its owners and occupiers. Chichester: Phillimore. ISBN 978-1-86-077431-7.
