= Wilton Park Estate =

Building in Beaconsfield, Buckinghamshire, England

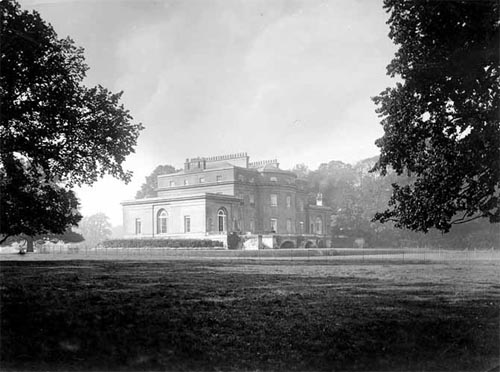
- Wilton Park at Beaconsfield in 1888
- Interactive map of the Wilton Park Estate area

General information
- Location: Beaconsfield, Buckinghamshire, England, United Kingdom
- Coordinates: 51°36′09″N 0°37′43″W
- Completed: 1779
- Demolished: 1968
- Client: Josias Du Pre, Governor of Madras

Design and construction
- Architect: Richard Jupp

The Wilton Park Estate is located in Beaconsfield in Buckinghamshire.

== History ==
The Wilton Park estate once belonged to the monks of Burnham Abbey. It is mentioned in 1412, with John Amond as farmer.

In 1702, it was acquired by the Basill family, who built a house on the estate. Sometime between 1760 and 1770, they sold the estate to Josias Du Pré, the future Governor of Madras. He commissioned the building of a mansion house on the estate, also known as the "White House", designed by Richard Jupp, which was completed in 1779.

In 1939, the house was taken over by the War Office and used as an interrogation centre for Nazi prisoners of war: German refugees working for the Allies would listen in secret into prisoners' conversations. After the Second World War, the house was used by the Foreign and Commonwealth Office to re-educate prisoners of war into the British way of life: between January 1946 and June 1948, approx 4,500 Germans were made to attend re-education classes there. The house went on to become the home of the Army School of Administration from 1949 and also the home of the Army School of Education from 1950. The Foreign Office "re-education" facility, still known as Wilton Park and still organising conferences, moved out in 1951 and is now based at Wiston House in West Sussex.

A single-storey blockhouse was constructed in the grounds of Wilton Park in 1954, to provide a protected wartime headquarters for the senior Army officers of Eastern Command and London District. From 1957, alternative provision was made for the General Officer Commanding-in-Chief, Eastern Command and his staff as part of the Regional Seats of Government planning; but the blockhouse was retained and remained available for use by London District until the end of the Cold War.

In the mid-1960s, three language wings were established on the site (Colonel Gaddafi of Libya studied there in 1966). (Note: The language wings replaced the Joint Services School for Linguists at RAF Tangmere.) Although the house was demolished in 1968, the language wings, which combined to form the Defence School of Languages, remained on the site until April 2014. In September 2014 a single story building known as the "Shean Block" was demolished. A 15 storey army accommodation block was built on the site in 1968 and was the tallest building in Buckinghamshire until it was demolished in 2025.

Standing sets for filming the ITV TV series Endeavour were built at Wilton Park in 2016.

In December 2019, Inland Homes was granted planning permission to develop the site and create 146 new homes. In April 2022, a relief road, providing improved access to the site was opened up to the public.

In September 2020, the historian, Helen Fry, published a book titled MI9: A History of the Secret Service for Escape and Evasion in World War Two describing what went on at Wilton Park during the Second World War and its subsequent use up to and including the 21st century.

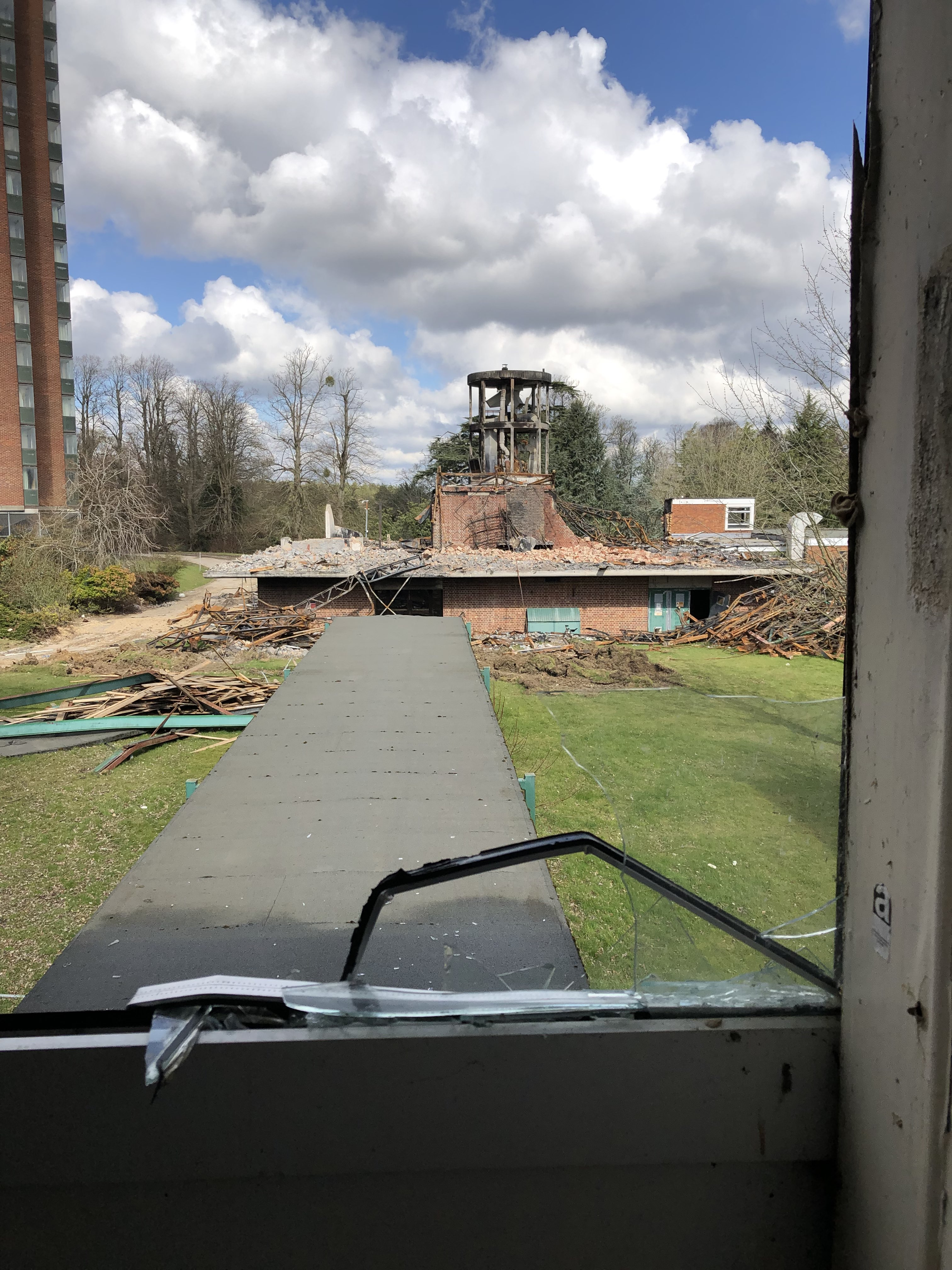
The aftermath of the fire in March 2022

In March 2022, a fire broke out at Wilton Park. It took three hours to get the fire under control: a building in between the fifteen storey tower block and Defence School of languages was destroyed, but nobody was hurt.

In May 2022, Inland Homes sold part of the site to another developer, Beechcroft Developments, for £19 million.
