= Portrait of Theodore Jacobsen (Hudson) =

Painting by Thomas Hudson

- Artist: Thomas Hudson
- Year: 1746
- Type: Oil on canvas, portrait painting
- Dimensions: 236.1 cm × 137.1 cm (93.0 in × 54.0 in)
- Location: Foundling Museum, London

Portrait of Theodore Jacobsen is a 1746 portrait painting by the British artist Thomas Hudson. It depicts the merchant and architect Theodore Jacobsen. Jacobsen was a London-born merchant of German parentage, who was a keen amateur architect. One of the governors of the newly-created Foundling Hospital, he was commissioned to design the building. He is shown standing at full-length with the architectural plans in his hands. The portrait was made for display at the Foundling Hospital, which Jacobsen had designed, and the plan he holds represents the building.

Hudson was a leading portraitist of the Georgian era and briefly included Joshua Reynolds amongst his pupils. The painting was presented to the Hospital, providing a companion to William Hogarth's Portrait of Captain Thomas Coram depicting the Foundling Hospital's founder. It remains in the collection of the Foundling Museum today. Hogarth himself had produced an earlier Portrait of Theodore Jacobsen in 1742, which is now in the Allen Memorial Art Museum in Ohio.

== Bibliography ==
- Bowron, Edgar Peters & Kerber, Peter Björn. Pompeo Batoni: Prince of Painters in Eighteenth-century Rome. Yale University Press, 2007.
- Burrows, Donald & Dunhill, Rosemary (ed.) Music and Theatre in Handel's World. Oxford University Press, 2002.
- Wagner, Gillian. Thomas Coram, Gent., 1668-1751. Boydell Press, 2004.
