= Portrait of Theodore Jacobsen (Hogarth) =

Painting by William Hogarth

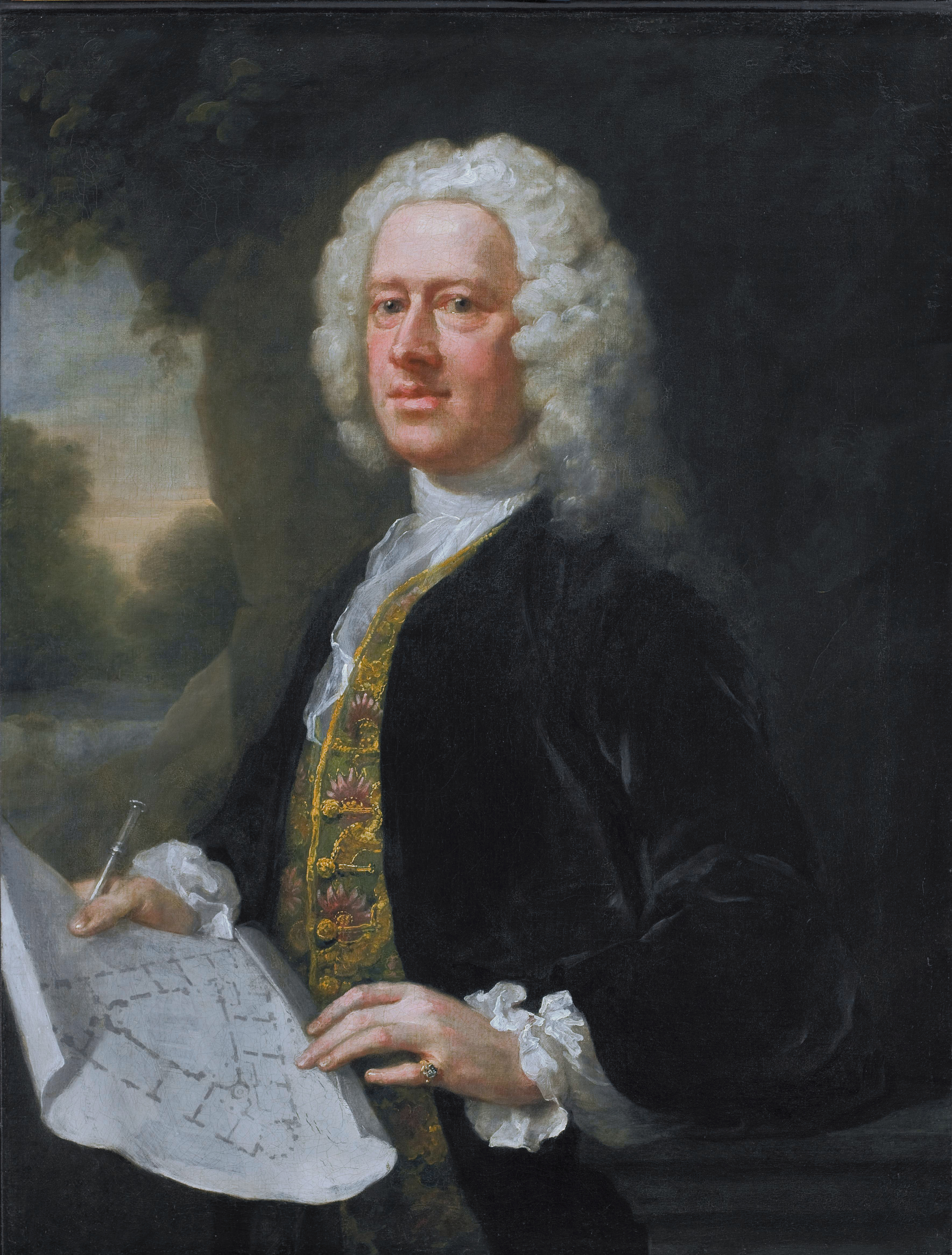
- Artist: William Hogarth
- Year: 1742
- Type: Oil on canvas, portrait painting
- Dimensions: 91.6 cm × 71.3 cm (36.1 in × 28.1 in)
- Location: Allen Memorial Art Museum; Ohio

Portrait of Theodore Jacobsen is a 1742 portrait painting by the British artist William Hogarth. It depicts the English merchant and architect Theodore Jacobsen. Jacobsen is best known for his design for the charitable Foundling Hospital in London, for which he gave his services for free. Hogarth was also closely connected to the organisation and donated paintings to the art collection of the new Hospital. He shows Jacobsen holding the architectural plants for the triangular Longford Castle in Wiltshire, and it is believed this work was commissioned by its owner Sir Jacob Bouverie. The painting is in the collection of the Allen Memorial Art Museum in Oberlin, Ohio, which acquired it in 1942. Thomas Hudson produced another noted Portrait of Theodore Jacobsen in 1746 which is now in the Foundling Museum.

== See also ==
- List of works by William Hogarth

== Bibliography ==
- Paulson, Ronald. Hogarth: High Art and Low. Lutterworth Press, 1991.
- Uglow, Jenny. William Hogarth: A Life and a World. Faber & Faber, 2011.
