= East India House =

Headquarters of the East India Company in London

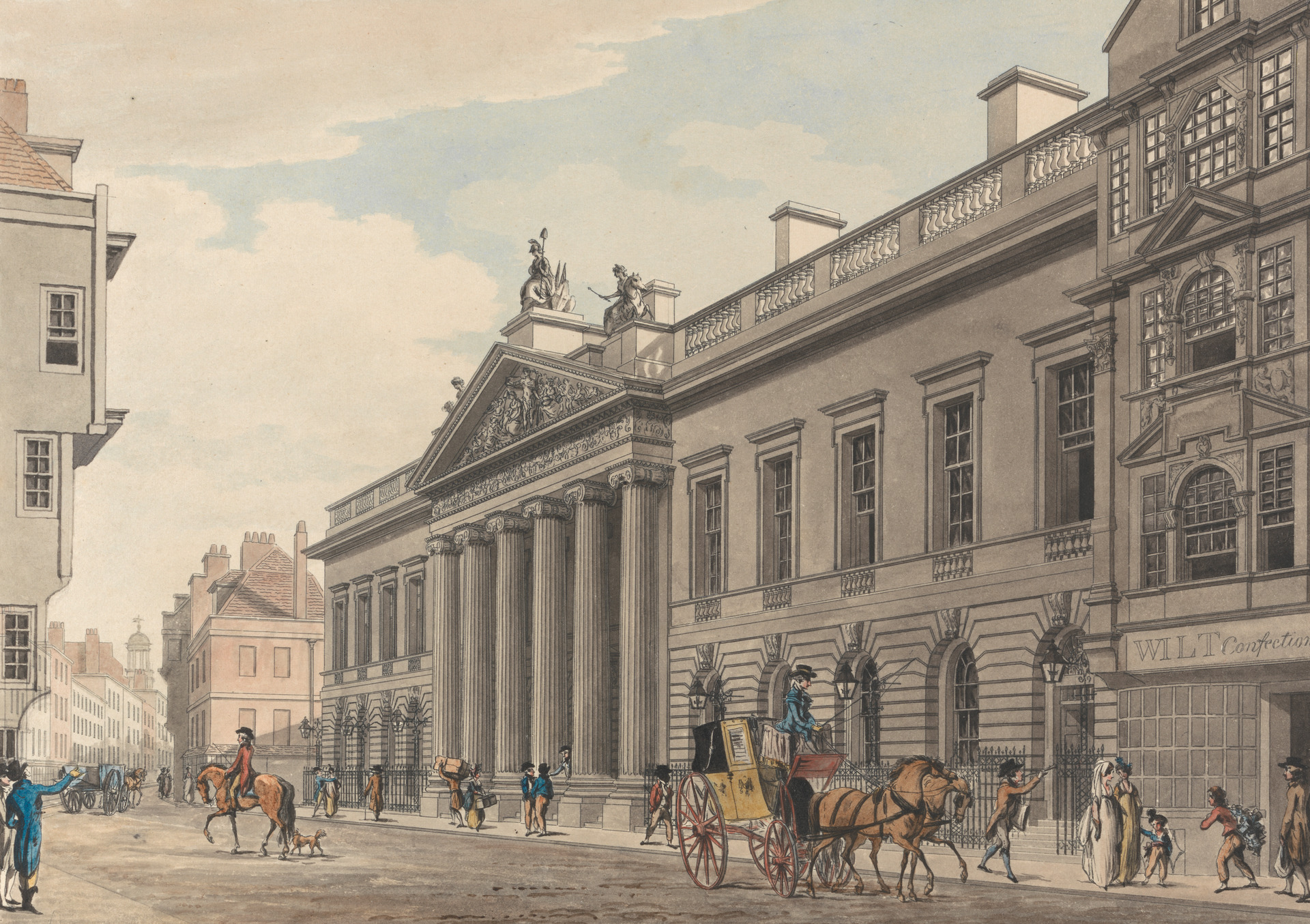
- The extended East India House in c. 1800, painted by Thomas Malton

General information
- Status: Demolished
- Architectural style: Neoclassical
- Location: Leadenhall Street, City of London, Great Britain
- Coordinates: 51.513°N 0.082°W
- Completed: 1729
- Renovated: 1796–1800
- Demolished: 1861
- Client: East India Company

Height
- Top floor: 4

Technical details
- Floor count: 4

Design and construction
- Architects: Theodore Jacobsen; Henry Holland; Richard Jupp

East India House was the London headquarters of the East India Company, from which much of British India was governed until the British government took control of the company's possessions in India in 1858. It was located in Leadenhall Street in the City of London. The first East India House on the site was an Elizabethan mansion, previously known as Craven House, which the Company first occupied in 1648. This was completely rebuilt in 1726–29; and further remodelled and extended in 1796–1800. It was demolished in 1861. The Lloyd's building, headquarters for Lloyd's of London, was built on the site of the former East India House.

== "Old" East India House ==
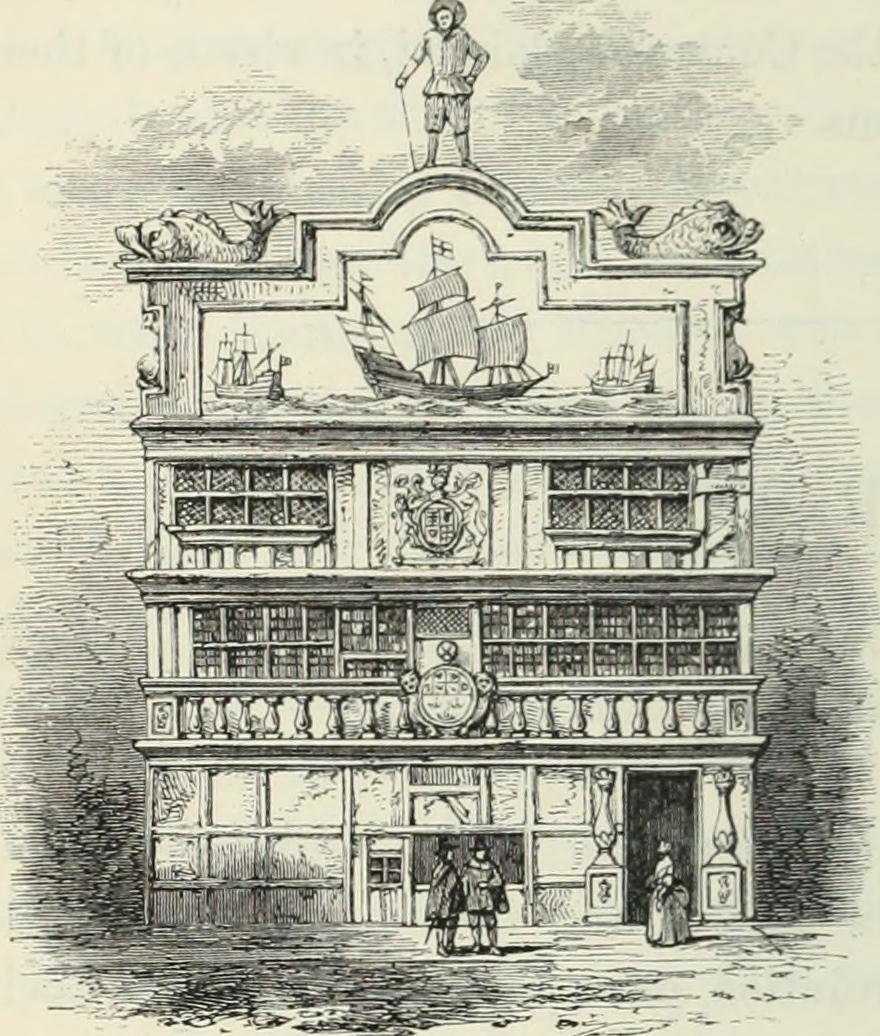
Old East India House: from a late 17th-century Dutch print.

The East India Company was founded in 1600. Until 1621, it occupied rooms in the mansion of its Governor, Sir Thomas Smythe, in Philpot Lane, Fenchurch Street; and from 1621 to 1638 it was housed in Crosby Hall, Bishopsgate. In 1638 it moved into the house of its new Governor, Sir Christopher Clitherow, in Leadenhall Street. Clitherow died in 1641, and although the Company remained in occupation it found the premises increasingly cramped.

In 1648, therefore, it took a lease on the adjoining property, Craven House, a late Elizabethan mansion built by Sir Robert Lee, Lord Mayor of London, and named after one of his successors, Sir William Craven, who had occupied it at a later date. By 1661 the building was known as East India House. In that year, the frontage was given an ornamental wooden superstructure decorated with paintings of some of the Company's ships, and surmounted by a wooden sculpture of a seaman. Over the years following, various improvements and extensions were made to the premises; and in 1710 a contract was signed for the company to buy the property from Lord Craven (although the purchase was not in fact completed until 1733). Further extensions were made, but by the mid-1720s the mansion was considered to be in such poor condition, and the company's need for additional space so pressing, as to justify complete rebuilding. To allow this to take place, the Company moved into temporary premises in Fenchurch Street early in 1726.

== "New" East India House ==
The new building was designed by the merchant and amateur architect Theodore Jacobsen. The professional architect on site was John James. Construction was completed by June 1729, when the company was able to hold its Midsummer General Court in its new home. Although the main front remained on Leadenhall Street, the premises extended a considerable distance to the rear, and included warehouses which could be reached from Lime Street. Further warehouses and other facilities were erected by William Jones in 1753.

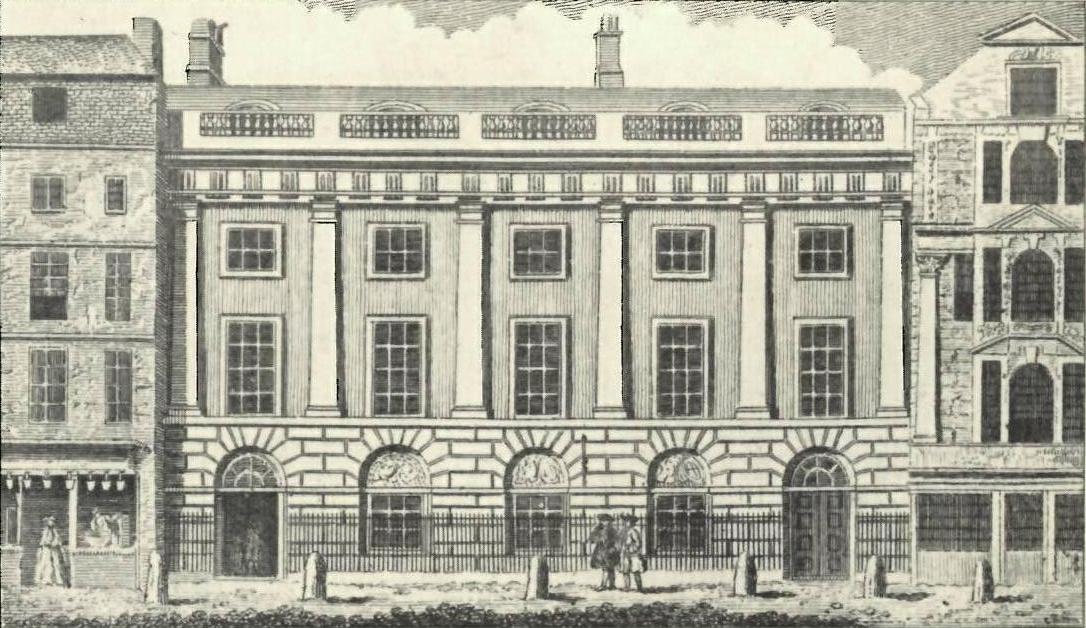
East India House: the Leadenhall Street frontage as rebuilt by Theodore Jacobsen in 1726–9. Engraving by T. Simpson, 1766.

The frontage as Jacobsen originally designed it is known from engravings, and from a detailed wash drawing by Samuel Wale of c. 1760. Its five bays were three storeys high, with an attic storey disguised behind the cornice balustrade. A giant order of Doric pilasters under an academically correct frieze of triglyphs demonstrated the East India Company's soundness and seriousness of purpose: the Directors' "aim was resolutely down to earth – to inspire confidence and impress the shareholders." The structure was unexpectedly deep, affording large meeting rooms and Directors' offices, as well as a hall, a courtyard and a garden, all of which could serve for receptions. The Directors' Court Room featured a marble chimneypiece with bearded term figures that supported the mantel shelf and an overmantel bas-relief panel, Britannia Receiving the Riches of the East, under a pediment, the work of Michael Rysbrack (1728–30). In the Directors' Court Room, six canvases by George Lambert appropriately illustrated the East India Company's main "factories": Saint Helena, Cape Town, Fort William, Calcutta, Bombay, Madras and Tellicherry; East Indiamen in the foregrounds were painted by the marine artist Samuel Scott. Carvings in the interiors were carried out by John Boson.

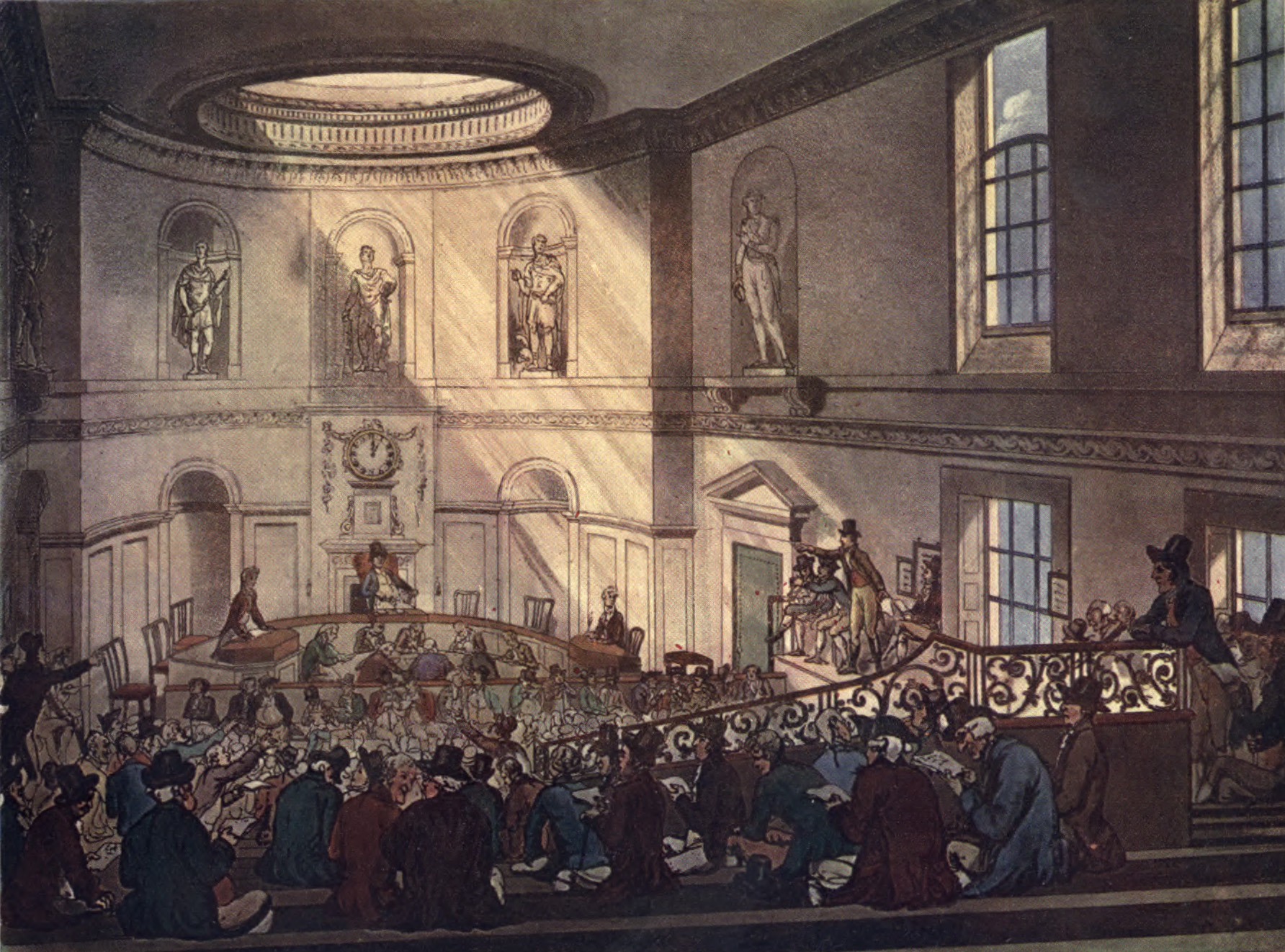
Sale Room of East India House drawn by Thomas Rowlandson & Augustus Charles Pugin, c. 1809

An oval ceiling painting for the Revenue Committee Room, The East Offering its Riches to Britannia, was painted by a little-known Greek artist Spiridione Roma in 1778.

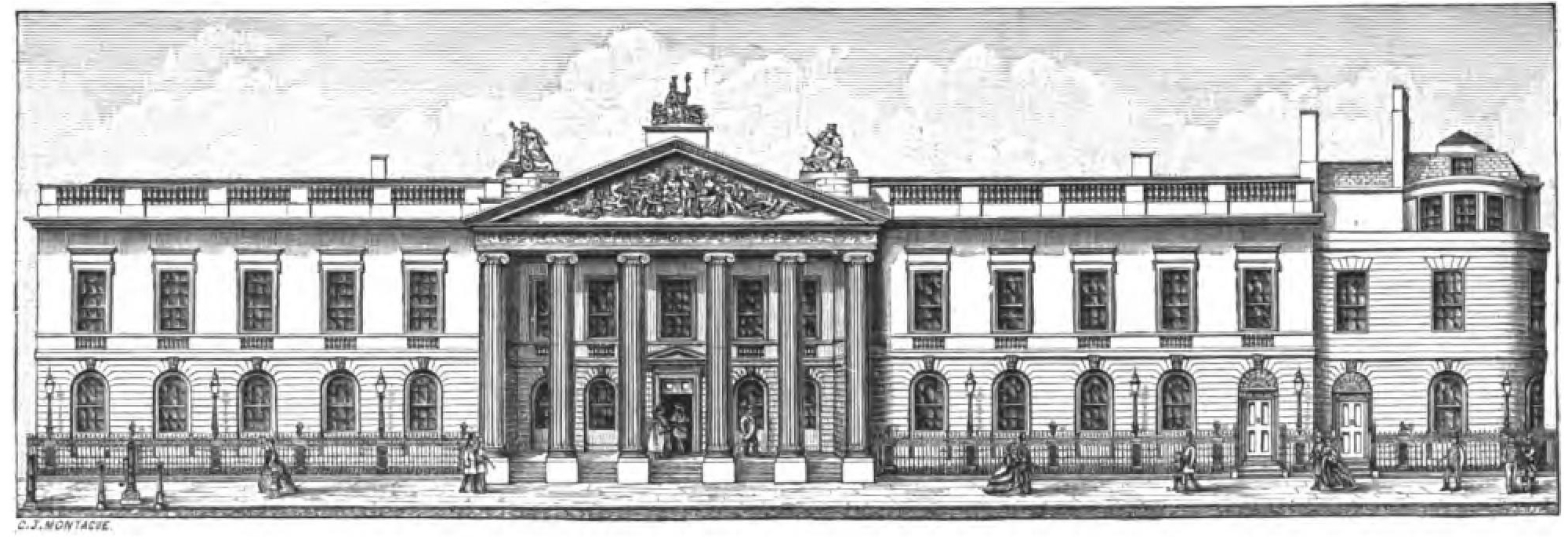
The Leadenhall Street frontage, as extended by Henry Holland and Richard Jupp in 1796–1800.

With the growth of the company, additional space was required, and in the 1790s adjoining structures to either side of East India House were purchased and pulled down. Designs to extend and reface the building were commissioned, after some canvassing among John Soane and George Dance, from Henry Holland – though even then the company's Surveyor, architect Richard Jupp, insisted on overseeing construction. Work on the new building began in 1796. After Jupp's sudden death in April 1799, it was completed by Holland. The company's museum was housed in one extension, the library in the other.

The essayist Charles Lamb worked as a clerk in East India House from 1792 to 1825. A portrait of Lamb by Henry Hoppner Meyer in 1826 shows him seated with East India House in the background. In his essay, "The Superannuated Man", he describes the "light excluding, pent-up offices, where candles for one-half the year supplied the place of the sun's light", and refers to Fish Street Hill, Fenchurch Street and Mincing Lane, which formed part of his walking route to work in Leadenhall Street.

The East India Company was wound up in 1858, when its assets passed to the government; and the building became the India Office. This, however, was only a temporary arrangement, as a new India Office building was already being planned for Whitehall. East India House was vacated in 1860, and the following year was sold for redevelopment and demolished.

== Legacy ==
The site of East India House is now occupied by the Lloyd's building.

Many of the old building's fittings, art collection and furniture were saved. Some are now to be found in India House, the seat of the Indian High Commission in London. Other items are held by the British Library as part of its Asia, Pacific and Africa Collections.

== See also ==
- List of demolished buildings and structures in London

== Bibliography ==
- Archer, Mildred (November 1965). "The East India Company and British art". Apollo: 401–09.
- Foster, Sir William (1924). The East India House: its History and Associations. London: John Lane.
- Lamb, Charles (1953). May, J. Lewis (ed.). Selected Essays, Letters and Poems. London: Collins.
