= Richard Jupp =

English architect (1728–1799)

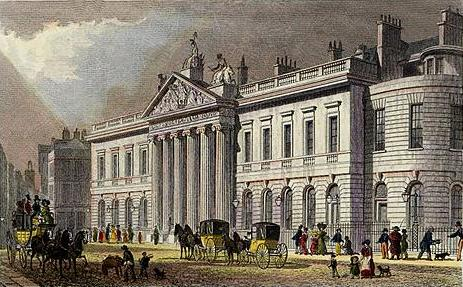
The expanded East India House, Leadenhall Street, London, as rebuilt 1799–1800, Richard Jupp, architect (as seen c. 1828; demolished in 1861–62)

Richard Jupp (1728 – 17 April 1799) was an English architect particularly associated with buildings in and around London. He served for many years (c. 1755 – 1799) as surveyor to the British East India Company.

== Works ==
His work included:

- alterations to St Matthias Old Church, Poplar, London (1755)
- Manor House, (Old Road, Lee, London (1772) - now a Grade II listed building) – built for a wealthy London West India merchant, Thomas Lucas, president of Guy's Hospital, but bought in 1796 by Sir Francis Baring, founder of Barings Bank, it is now used as a public library and its gardens have become a public park (Manor House Gardens).
- Painshill House, near Cobham, Surrey (1774)
- Entrance and wings of Guy's Hospital, London (1774–1777)
- Wilton Park House, near Beaconsfield (c. 1780)
- a folly, Severndroog Castle (built as a memorial to Commodore Sir William James – a former chairman of the East India Company), on Shooter's Hill in south-east London (1784).
- East India House, Leadenhall Street, London (1796–1799 – the project was completed after Jupp's death by his successor, Henry Holland)

== Death ==
Jupp died at his house in King's Road (now Theobald's Road), Bedford Row, on 17 April 1799.

== Sources ==
- Lee, Sidney, ed. (1892). "Jupp, Richard" . Dictionary of National Biography. Vol. 30. London: Smith, Elder & Co.
