= Fife House, Whitehall =

Coordinates: 51.501°N 0.125°W

Fife House was a building in Whitehall, London. It was the home of politicians, including Robert Jenkinson, 2nd Earl of Liverpool, Prime Minister from 1812 to 1827. The house was demolished in 1869.

== History ==
The house later known as Fife House was built by the politician Edmund Dunch, on grounds adjacent to the River Thames where buildings had been destroyed in a fire of 1698. After his death in 1719 it was the home of his widow Elizabeth, who died in 1761, the house being then purchased by Joshua Steele. It was soon afterwards purchased by James Duff, 2nd Earl Fife. In 1766 the interior was redesigned by Robert and James Adam. In 1803 the house was enlarged by the acquisition of adjoining properties.

The Earl died at Fife House on 24 January 1809; on 27 July of that year it was purchased by Robert Jenkinson, 2nd Earl of Liverpool. He made repairs and alterations, designed by John Soane. The Earl of Liverpool was Prime Minister from 1812 to 1827, and Fife House was a centre of political life.

After his death in 1828, the house became the home of his half-brother Charles Jenkinson, 3rd Earl of Liverpool, until his death in 1851. For a few years from 1855 his daughter Viscountess Milton and her husband G. S. Foljambe lived in the house.

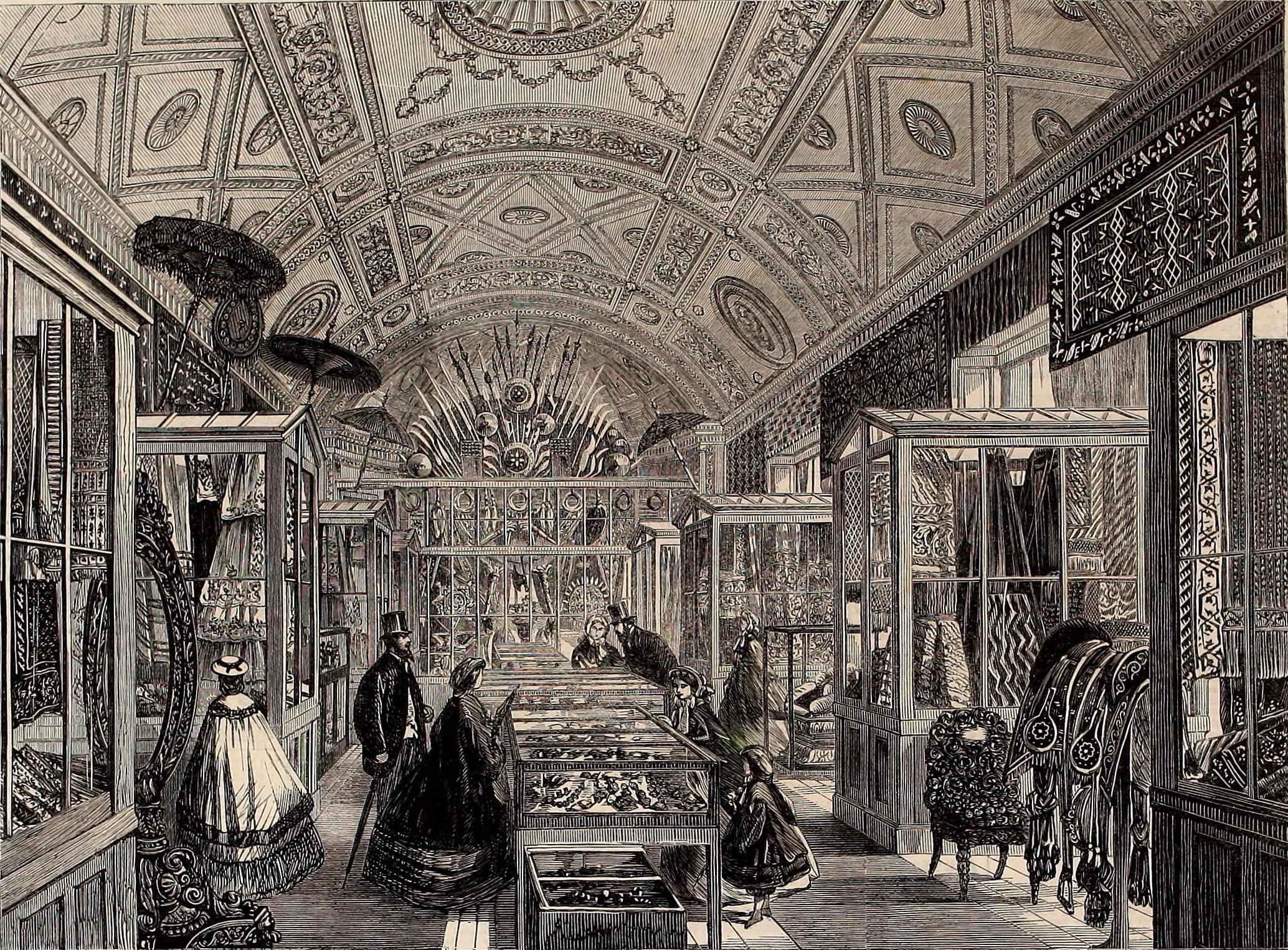
The New India Museum, in Fife House, 1861

It was the temporary home of the India Museum from 1861 until 1869. In that year the house was demolished.
