= John Forbes Watson =

Scottish physician and expert on India (1827-1892)

John Forbes Watson (1827–1892) was a Scottish physician and writer on India.

== Life ==
Born in Scotland, Watson was the son of an Aberdeenshire farmer, George Watson and his wife Jean McHardy. He was educated at the University of Aberdeen, where he graduated M.A. in March 1847, and M.D. on 5 August 1847. He completing his medical studies at Guy's Hospital, London, and in Paris.

Watson was appointed assistant surgeon in the Bombay army medical service in August 1850. He served with the artillery at Ahmednagar and with the Scinde horse at Khangarh (Jacobabad), and was then appointed assistant surgeon to the Jamsetjee Hospital and lecturer on physiology at Grant Medical College. There for a time he also acted as professor of medicine and lecturer on clinical medicine.

Returning to England on sick leave in 1853, Watson spent some time at the School of Mines in London's Jermyn Street. He was then appointed by the court of directors of the East India Company to run an investigation into the food grains of India. In 1858 he was nominated by the secretary of state reporter on the products of India and director of the India Museum, appointments which he held till the transfer to South Kensington of the India Museum at the end of 1879. His medical practice dropped back from the mid-1850s.

In 1874 Watson submitted to government a proposal for the establishment of an Indian museum and library, together with an Indian institute in a central position, where candidates for the civil service might pursue oriental studies. His argument for a museum for India and the colonies was supported by the Royal Colonial Institute, and was a factor in the establishment of the Imperial Institute. He represented India at the 1862 International Exhibition in London, at the International Exposition (1867) in Paris, and at the 1873 Vienna World's Fair; and at the South Kensington annual exhibitions from 1870 to 1874.

Foster retired from the India Office in 1880, and died at Upper Norwood on 29 July 1892. He was elected a fellow of the Linnean Society in 1889.

== Works ==
Watson was the author of:

- The Textile Manufactures and the Costumes of the People of India, London, 1866.
- Index to the Native and Scientific Names of Indian and other Eastern Economic Plants and Products, London, 1868.
- International Exhibitions, London, 1873.

In 1855 Watson published a pamphlet on the sanitary application of charcoal. He also drew up catalogues for the Indian departments at international exhibitions, and with John William Kaye edited Meadows Taylor's People of India, London, 1868–1872, 6 vols.

As part of his departmental work, Watson established a photographic branch. Numerous photographs were made in depicting India, and large maps of the country in relief. They were used to illustrate his own works and those of other writers.

== Family ==
Watson was married, and was survived by his widow, Amelia Mary Anne Watson.
