= India Museum =

Former museum in London

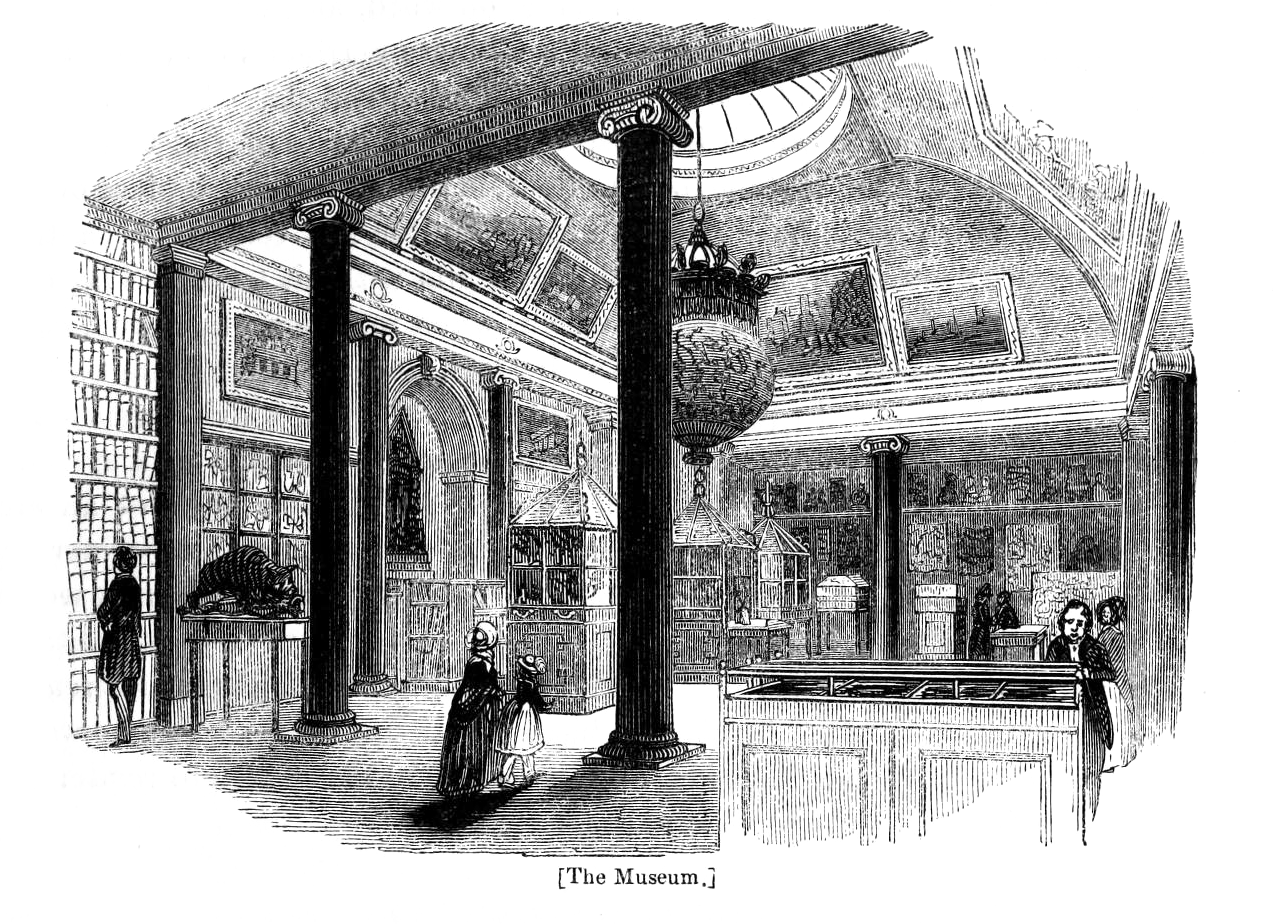
The museum in 1841. On the left is Tipu's Tiger.

The India Museum was a London museum of India-related exhibits, established in 1801. It was closed in 1879 and its collection dispersed, part of it later forming a section in the South Kensington Museum.

== History ==
The museum, of the East India Company, was established in 1801, in East India House in Leadenhall Street, London. The first curator was Sir Charles Wilkins, an orientalist. He had lived in India from 1770 to 1786, in the service of the East India Company; he was said to be the first Englishman to gain a thorough grasp of Sanskrit.

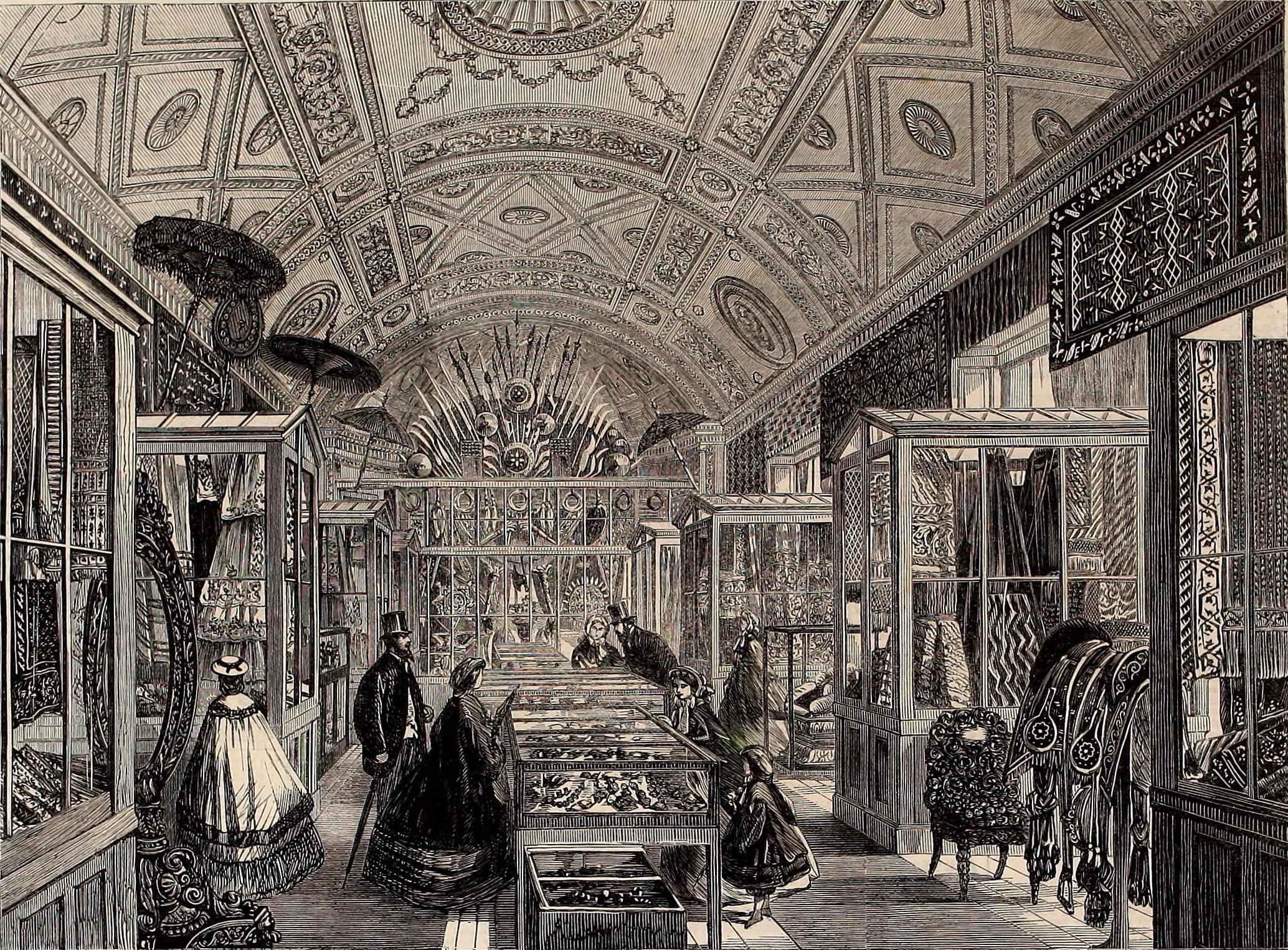
The New India Museum, in Whitehall-Yard, 1861

When the East India Company was disbanded in 1858, the India Office was established, and the museum collection was moved in 1861 to Fife House in Whitehall; East India House was demolished in 1863. The director of the museum was John Forbes Watson. In 1869 the collection was moved to the India Office, and in 1875 it was moved temporarily to the South Kensington Museum (later renamed the Victoria and Albert Museum).

The India Museum was dissolved in 1879. Most of the collection went to the British Museum, Kew Gardens and the South Kensington Museum, where the Indian section was opened in 1880; it was known as the India Museum until 1945.
