= Thomas Hudson (painter) =

English painter (1701–1779)

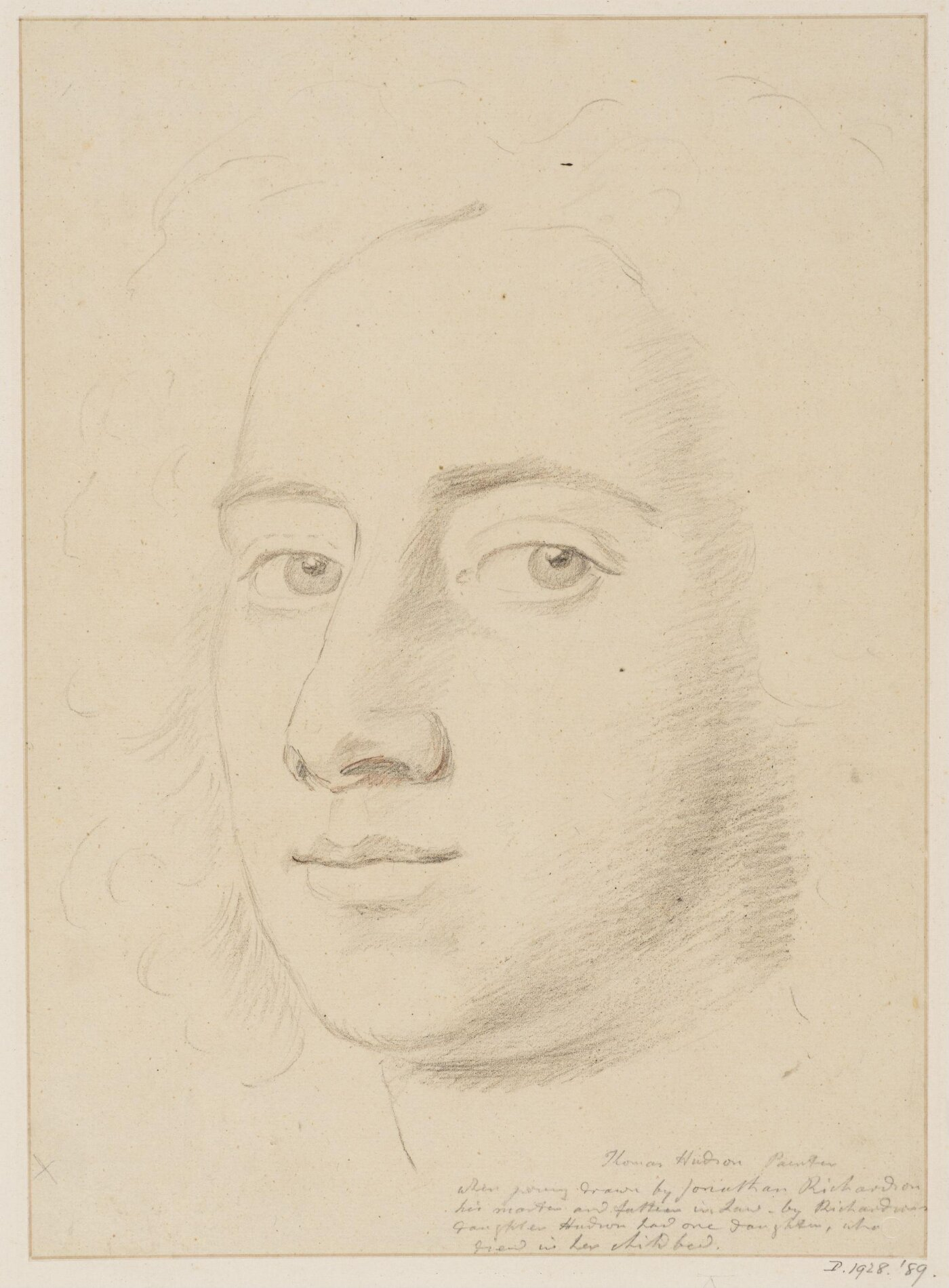
- Portrait by Jonathan Richardson the Younger, 1745
- Born: 1701; Devon, England
- Died: 26 January 1779 (aged 77–78); Twickenham, London
- Occupation: English portrait painter

Thomas Hudson (1701 – 26 January 1779) was an English painter who specialised in portrait painting.

== Life ==
Hudson was born in Devon, in 1701. He studied under Jonathan Richardson in London and, against the latter's wishes, married Richardson's daughter at some point before 1725.

Hudson was most prolific between 1740 and 1760 and, from 1745 until 1755 was the most successful London portraitist. He had many assistants, and employed the specialist drapery painter Joseph Van Aken. Joshua Reynolds, Joseph Wright and the drapery painter Peter Toms were his students.

Hudson visited the Low Countries in 1748 and Italy in 1752. In 1753, he bought a house at Cross Deep, Twickenham, just upstream from Pope's Villa. He retired toward the end of the 1750s. William Hickey described the elderly Hudson, "His figure was rather grotesque, being uncommonly low in stature, with a prodigious belly, and constantly wearing a large white bushy periwig. He was remarkably good tempered, and one of my first-rate favourites, notwithstanding that he often told me I should certainly be hanged." He died at Twickenham in 1779, aged 77 or 78. His extensive private art collection was sold off in three separate sales.

Many of Hudson's works may be seen in art galleries throughout the United Kingdom. They include the National Portrait Gallery, the National Maritime Museum, Tate, Barnstaple Guildhall, Foundling Museum and the Bristol City Museum and Art Gallery.

== Gallery ==
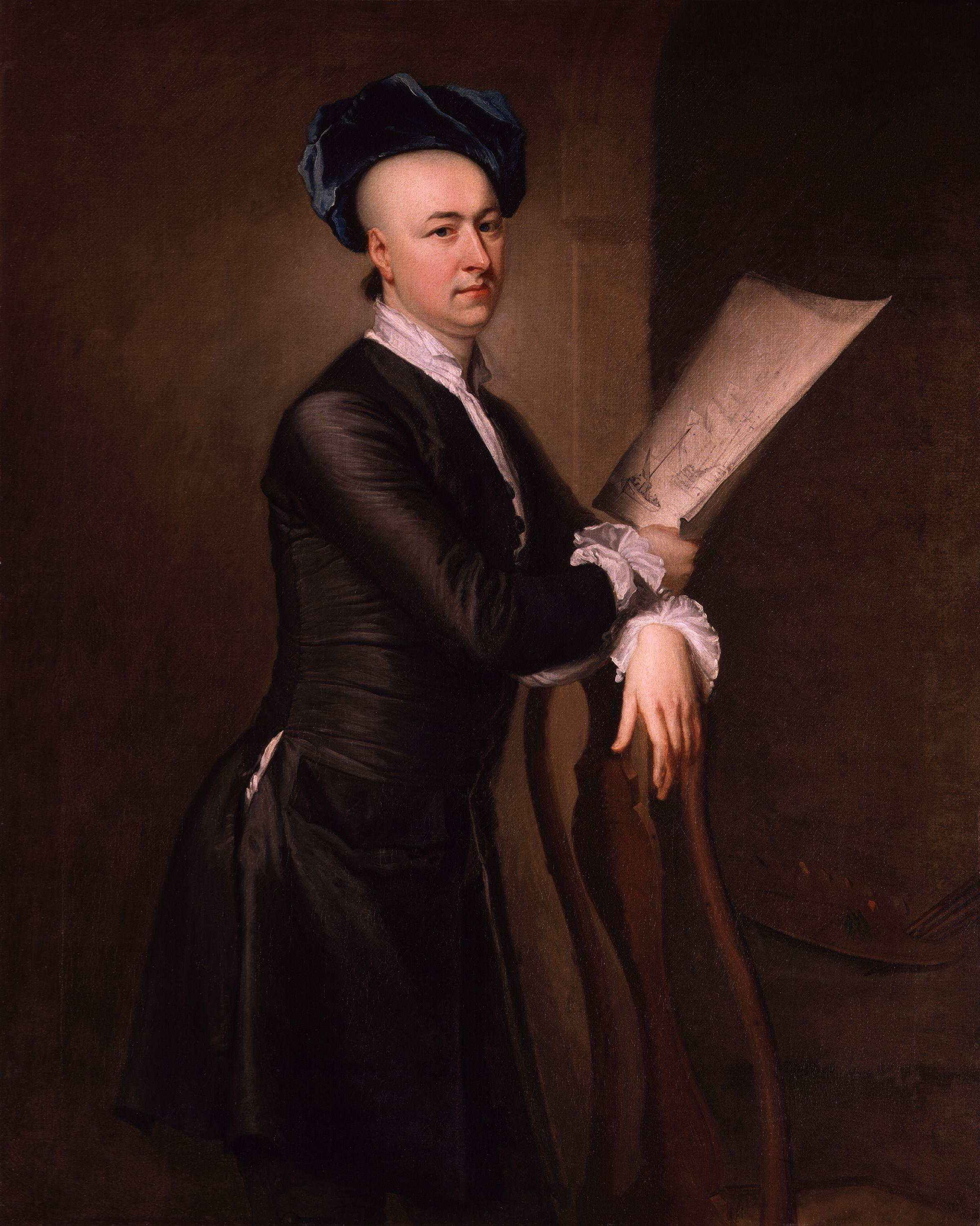
Portrait of Samuel Scott, 1733

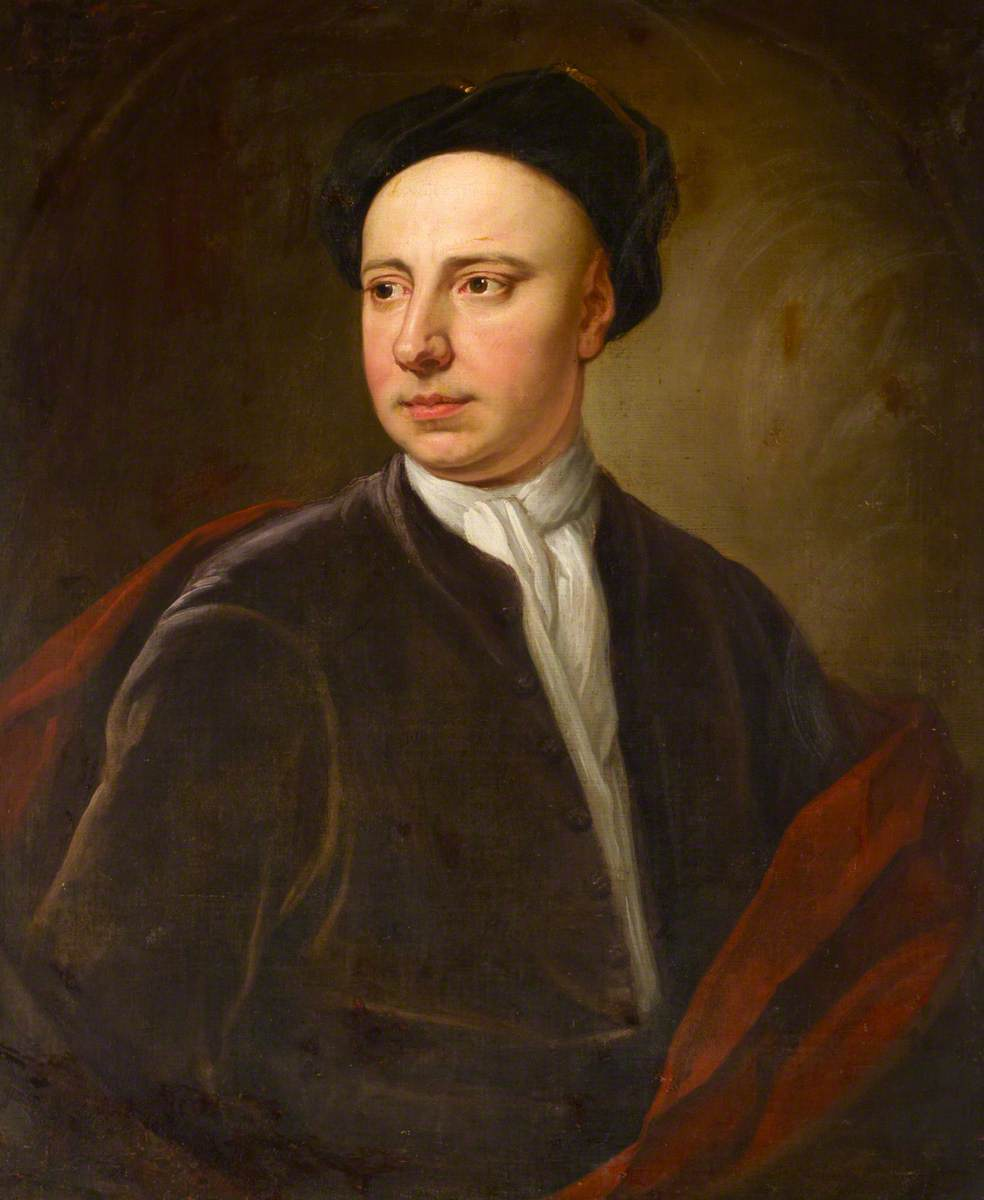
James Thomson, 1735

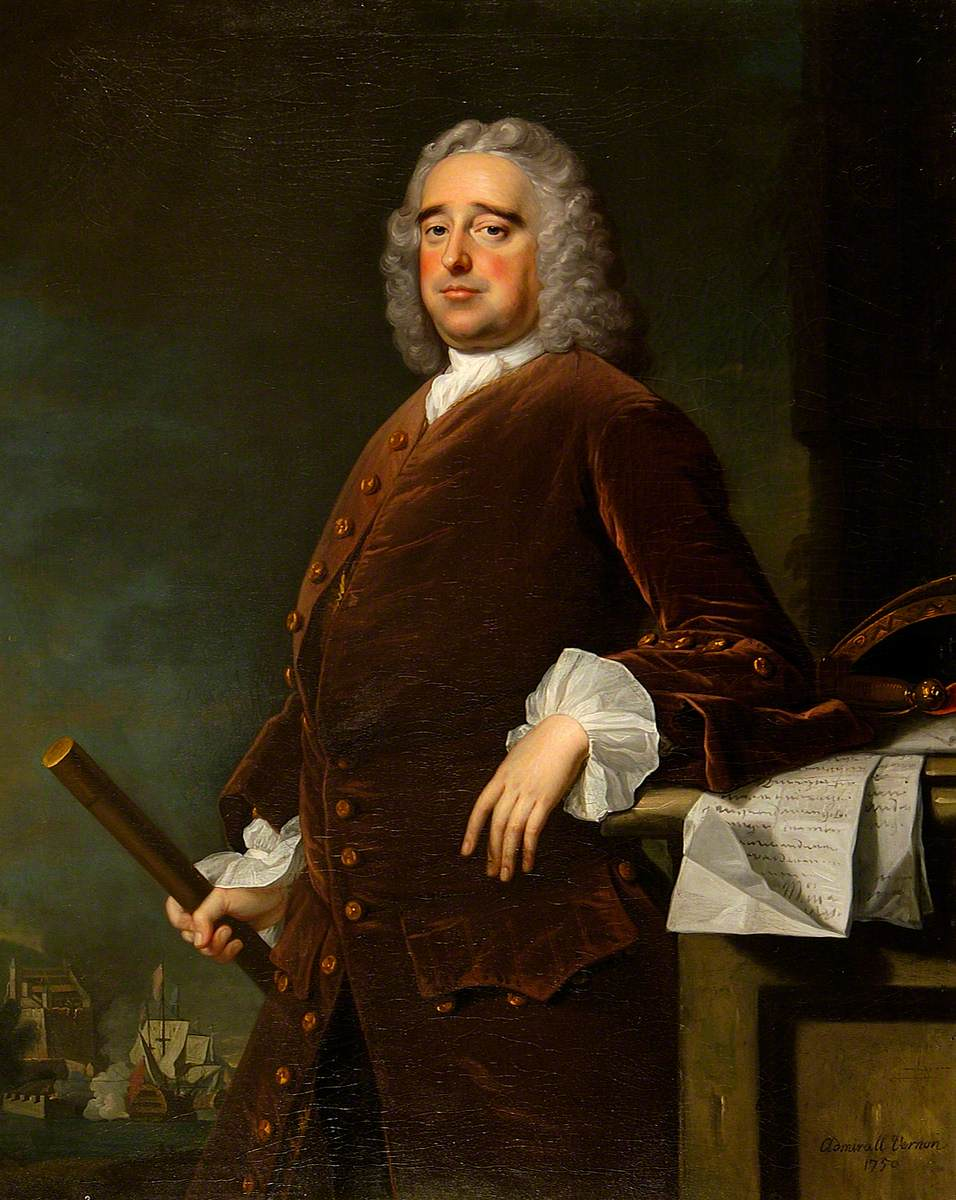
Edward Vernon, 1739

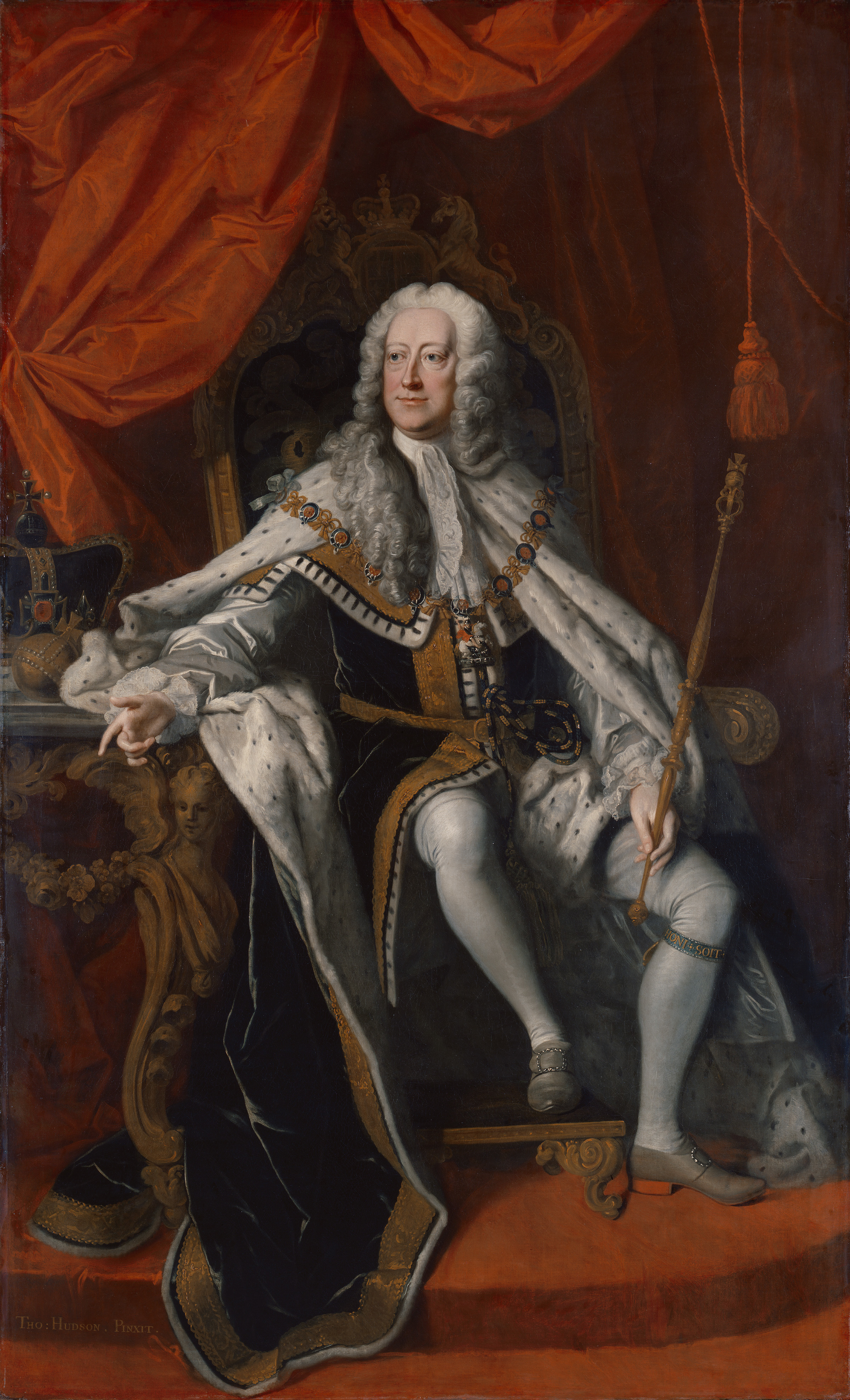
Portrait of George II, 1744

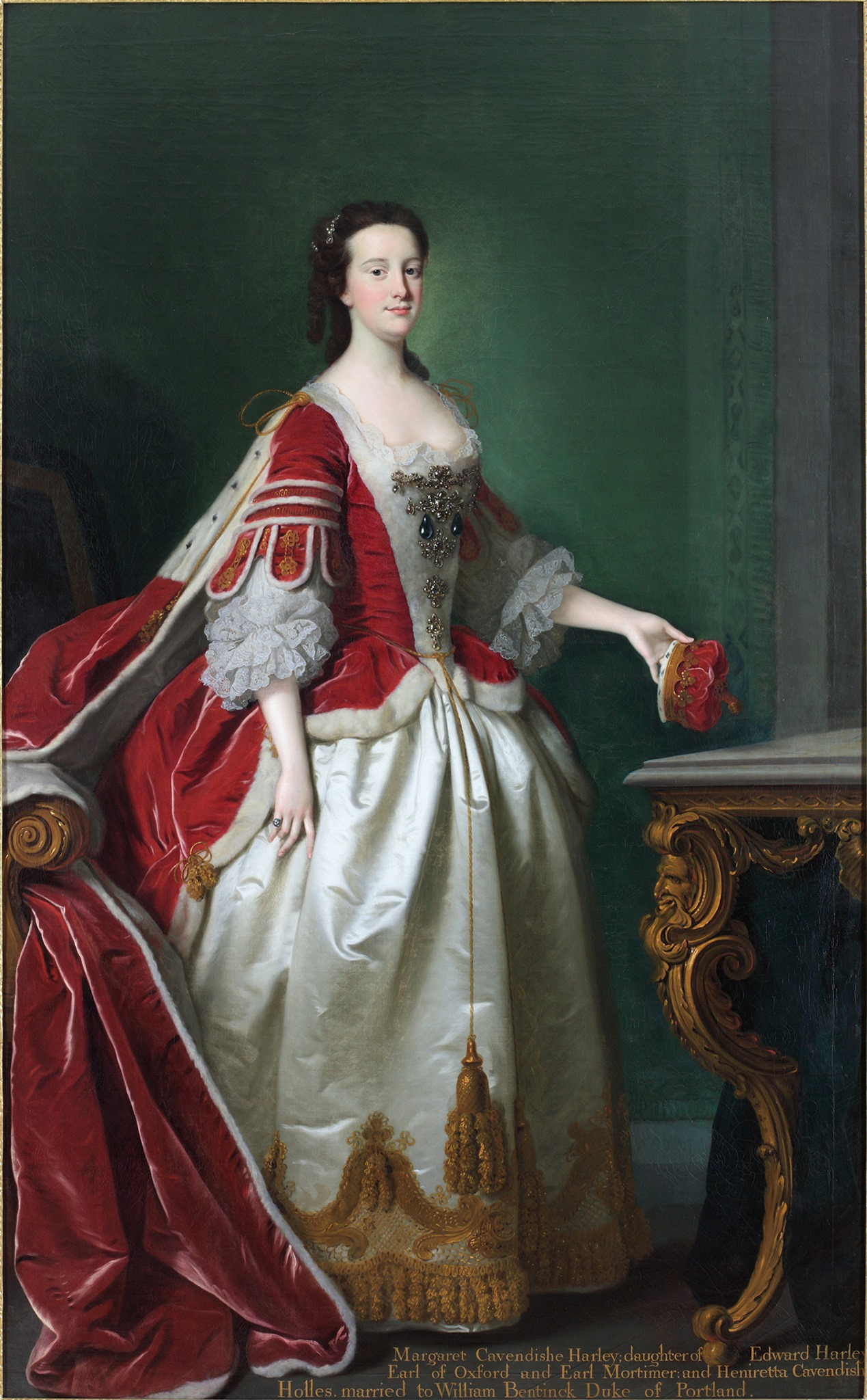
Duchess of Portland, 1744

Portrait of Theodore Jacobsen, 1746

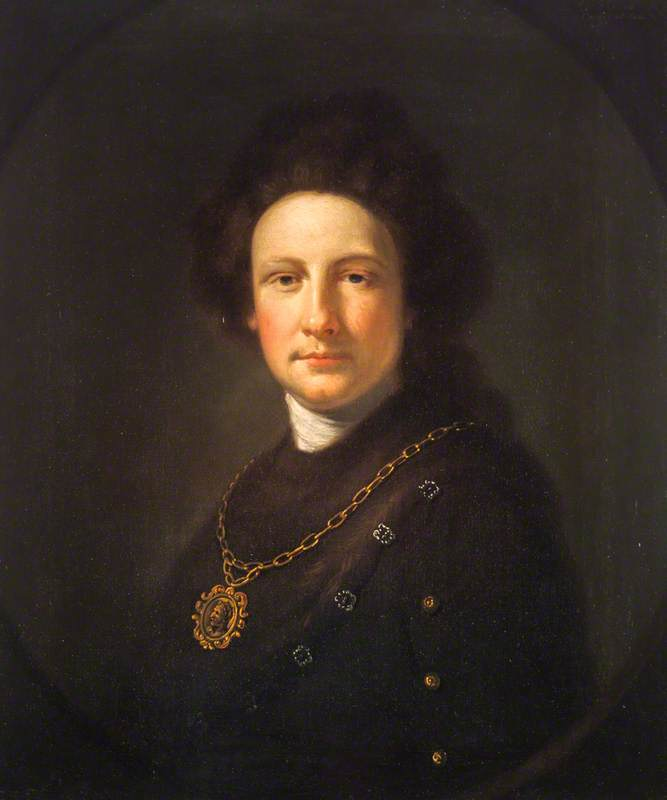
Charles Erskine, 1747

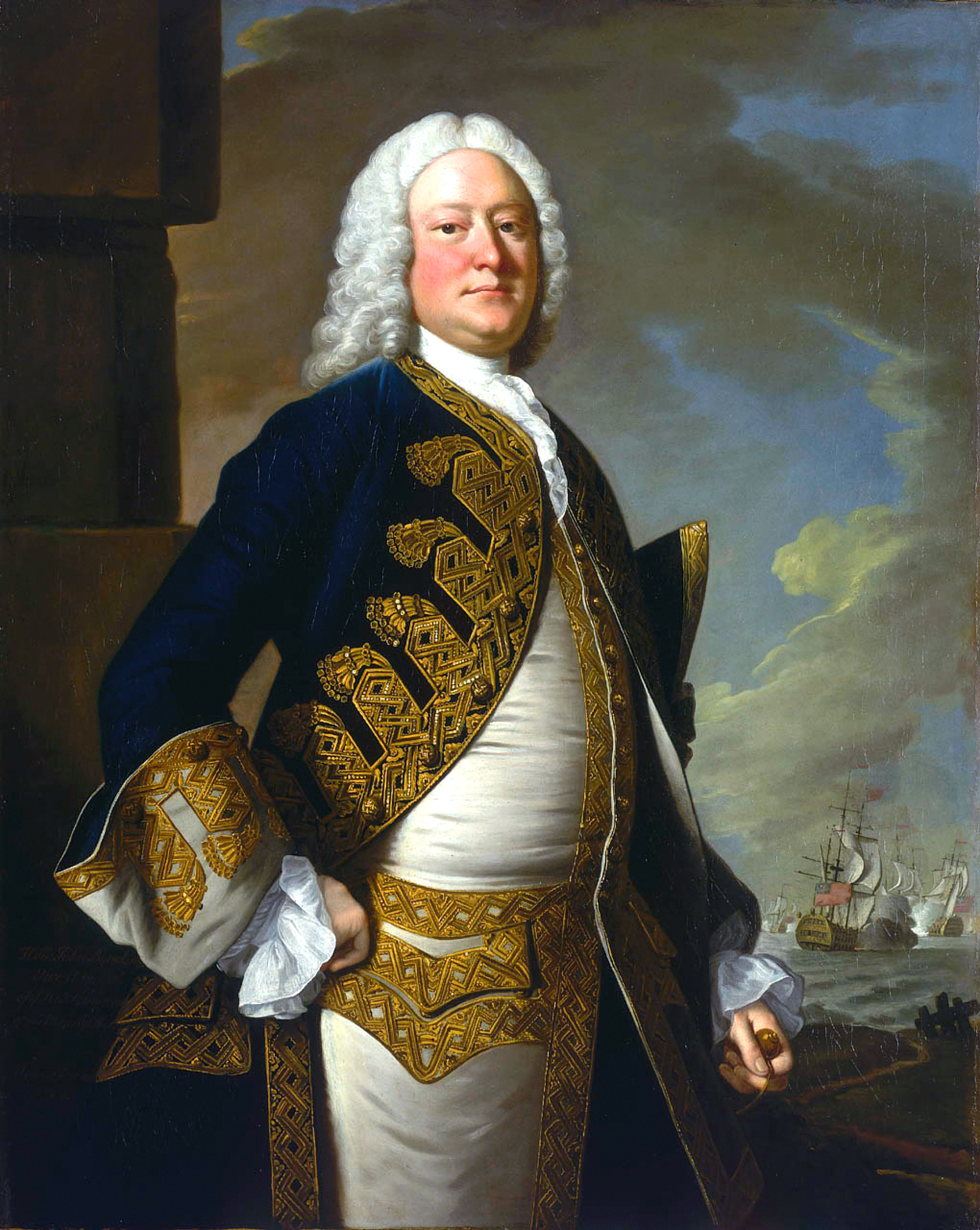
Portrait of Admiral Byng, 1749

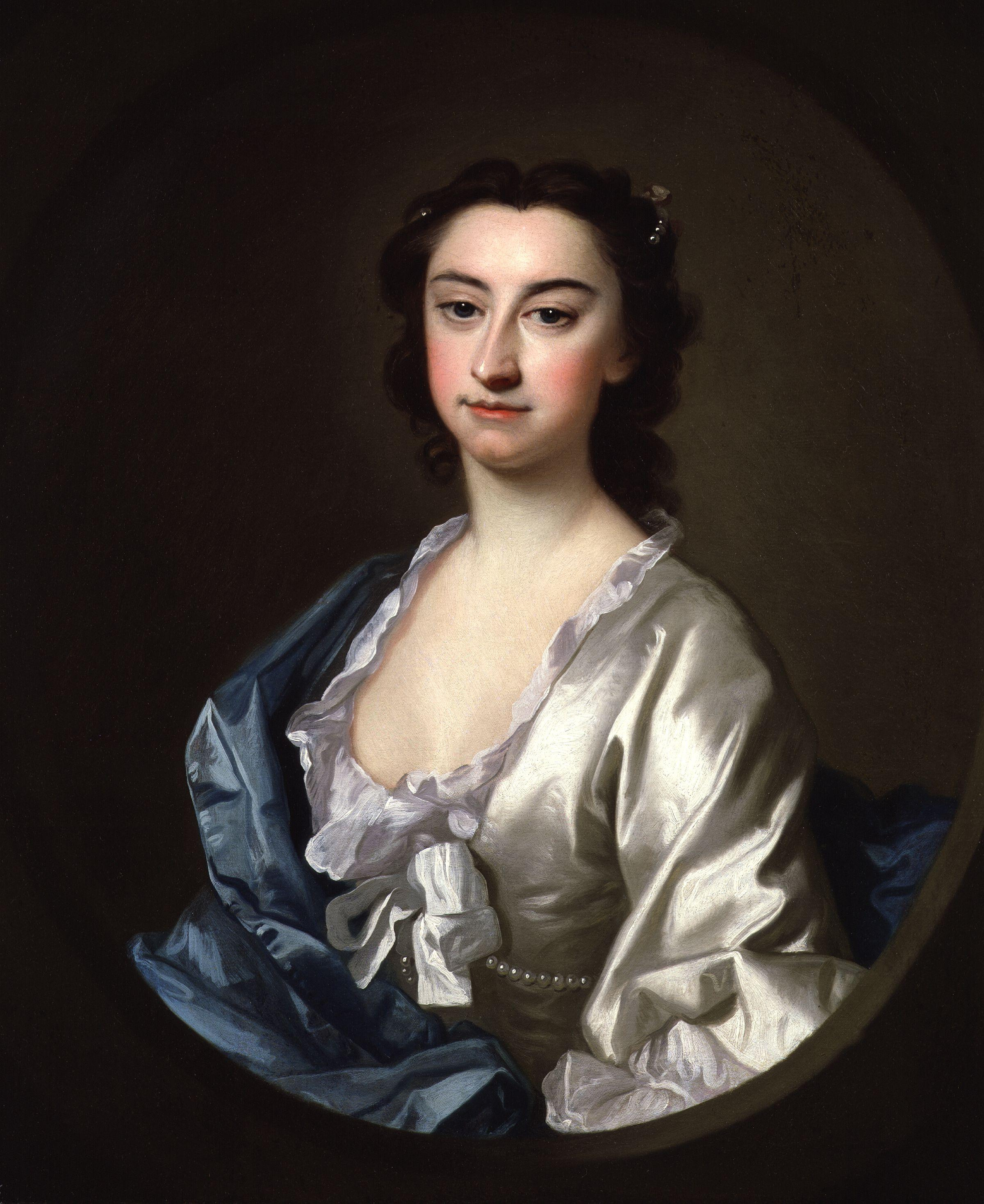
Susannah Maria Cibber, 1749

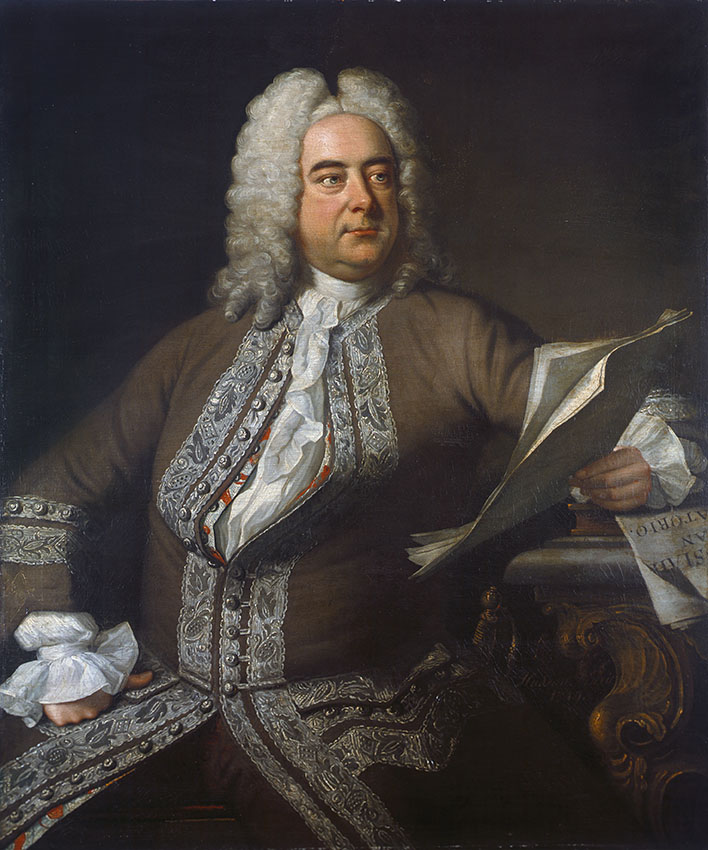
George Frideric Handel, 1749

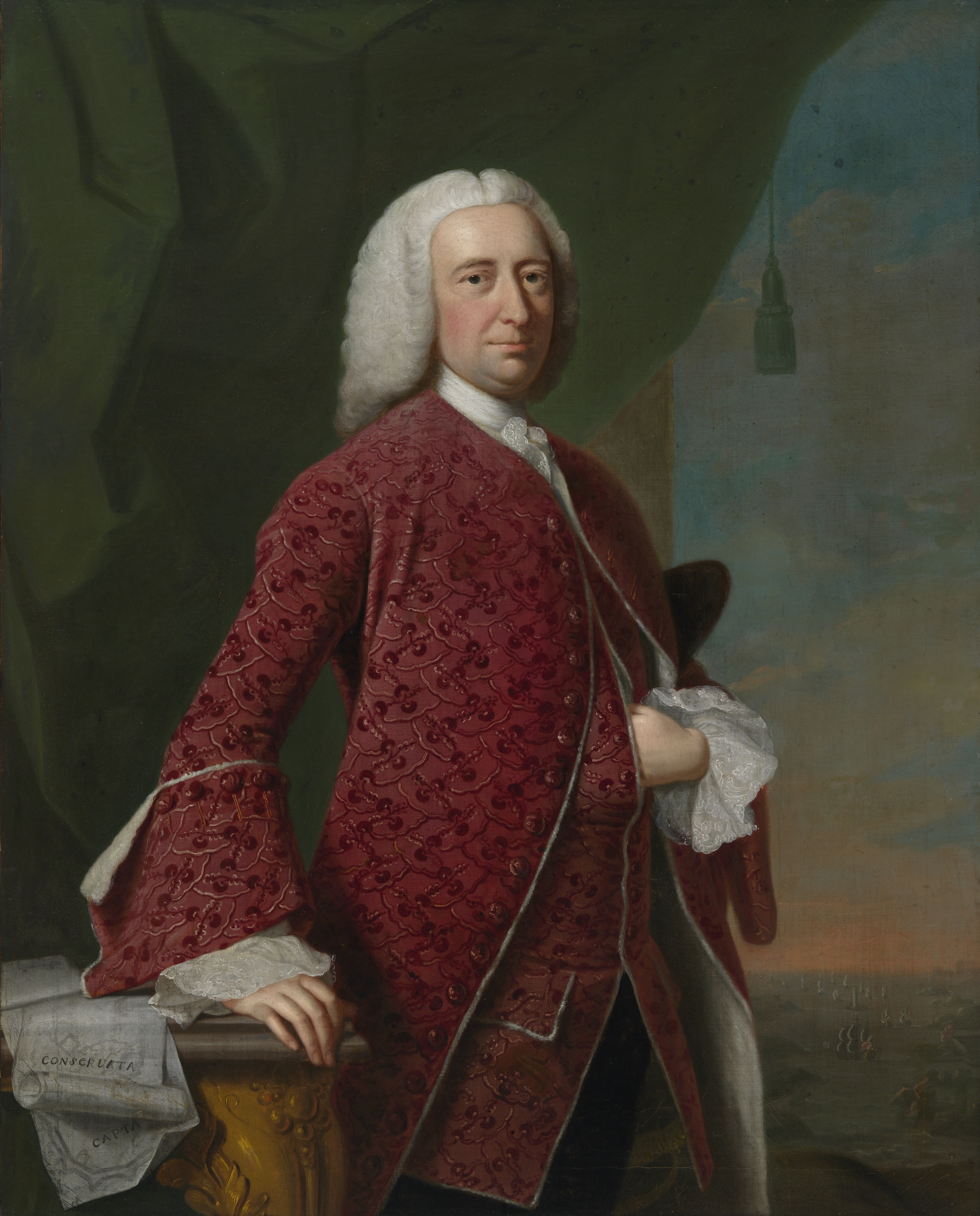
Portrait of William Shirley, 1750

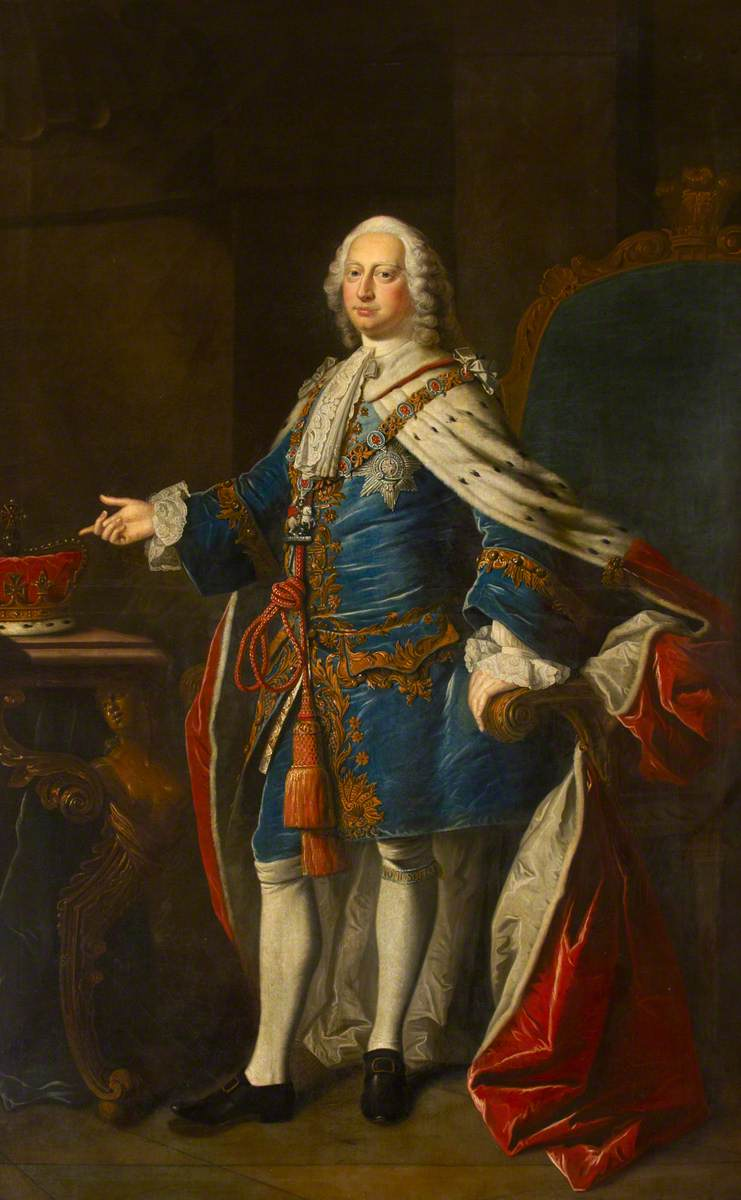
Frederick, Prince of Wales, 1750

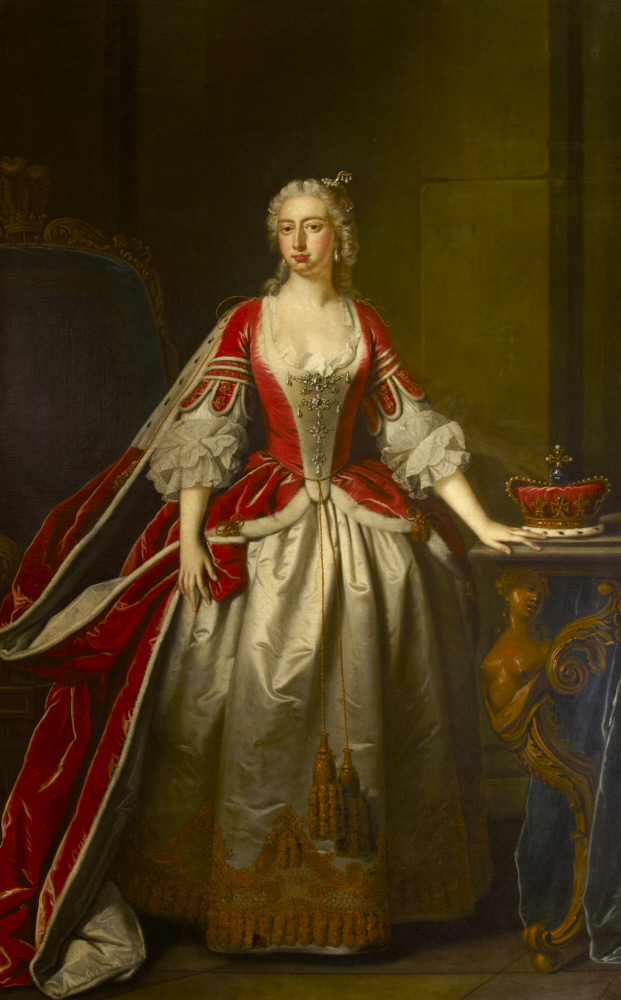
Augusta, Princess of Wales, 1750

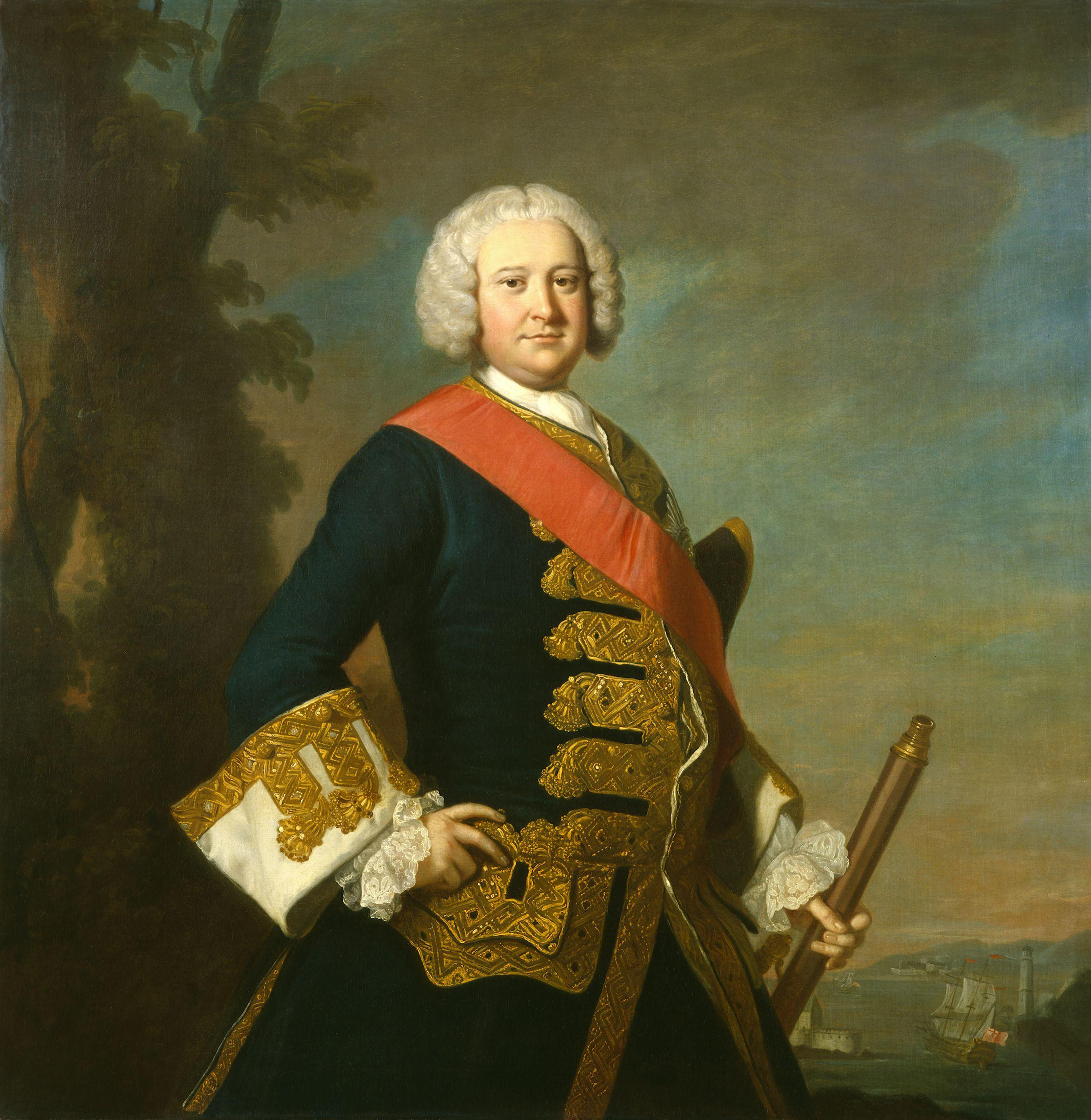
Admiral Peter Warren, c. 1751

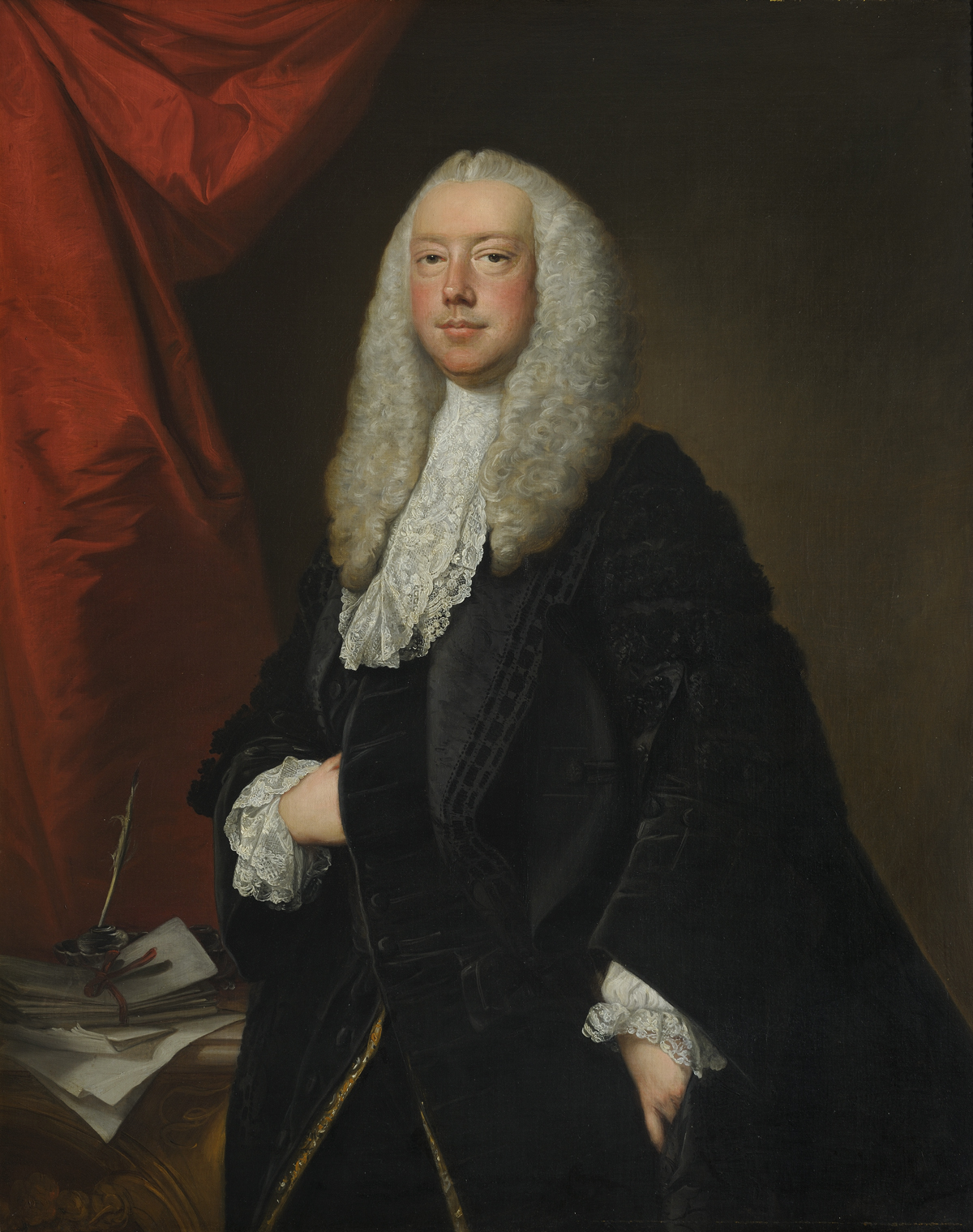
Charles Yorke, c. 1756

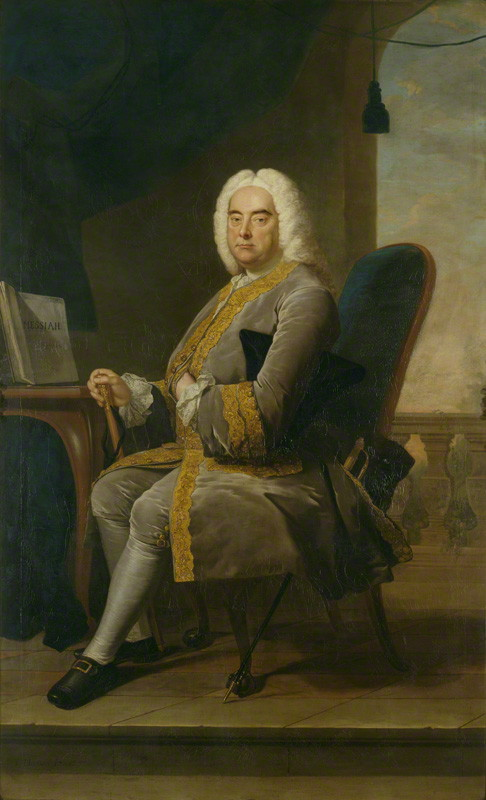
Portrait of George Frideric Handel, 1756

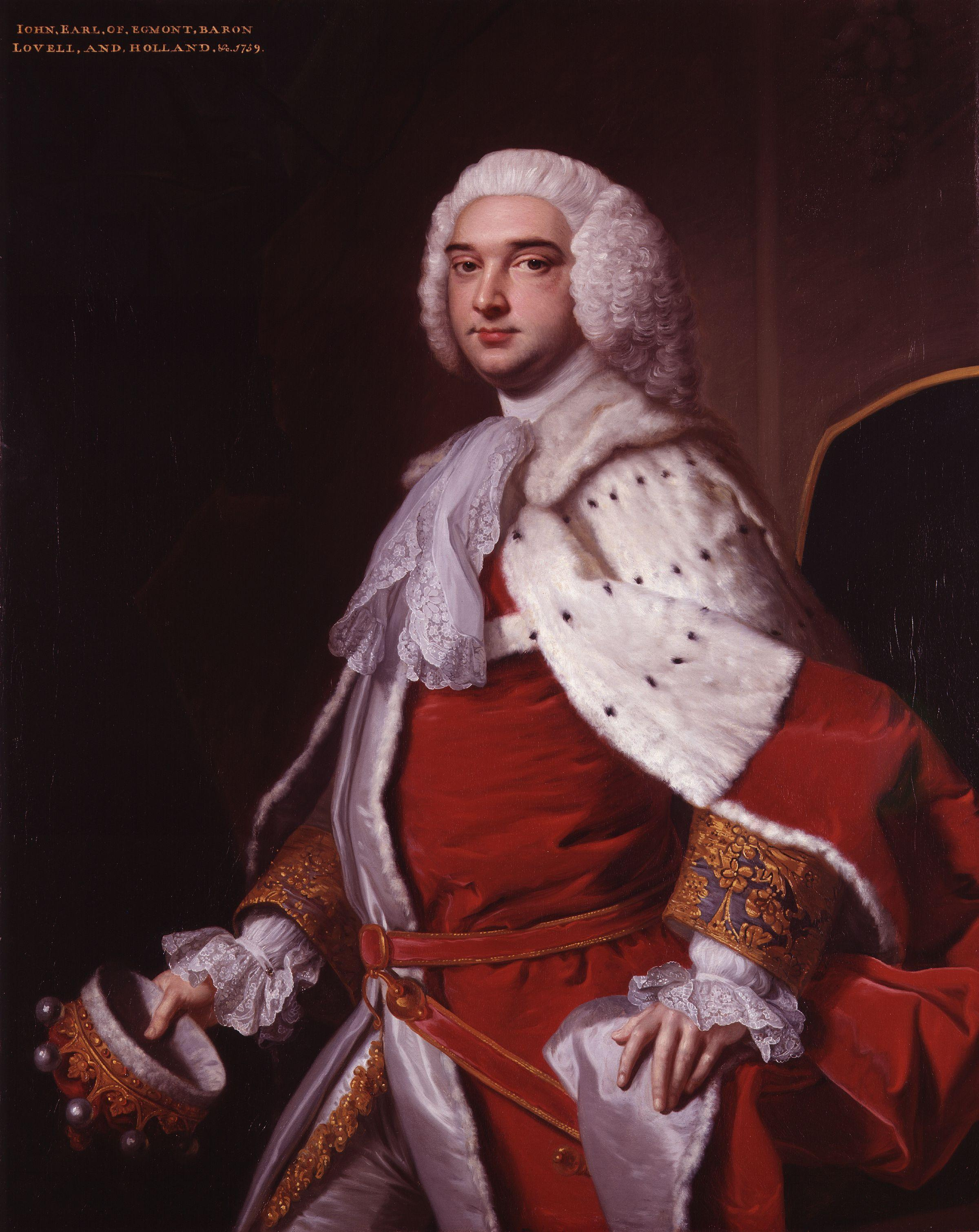
Earl of Egmont, c. 1759

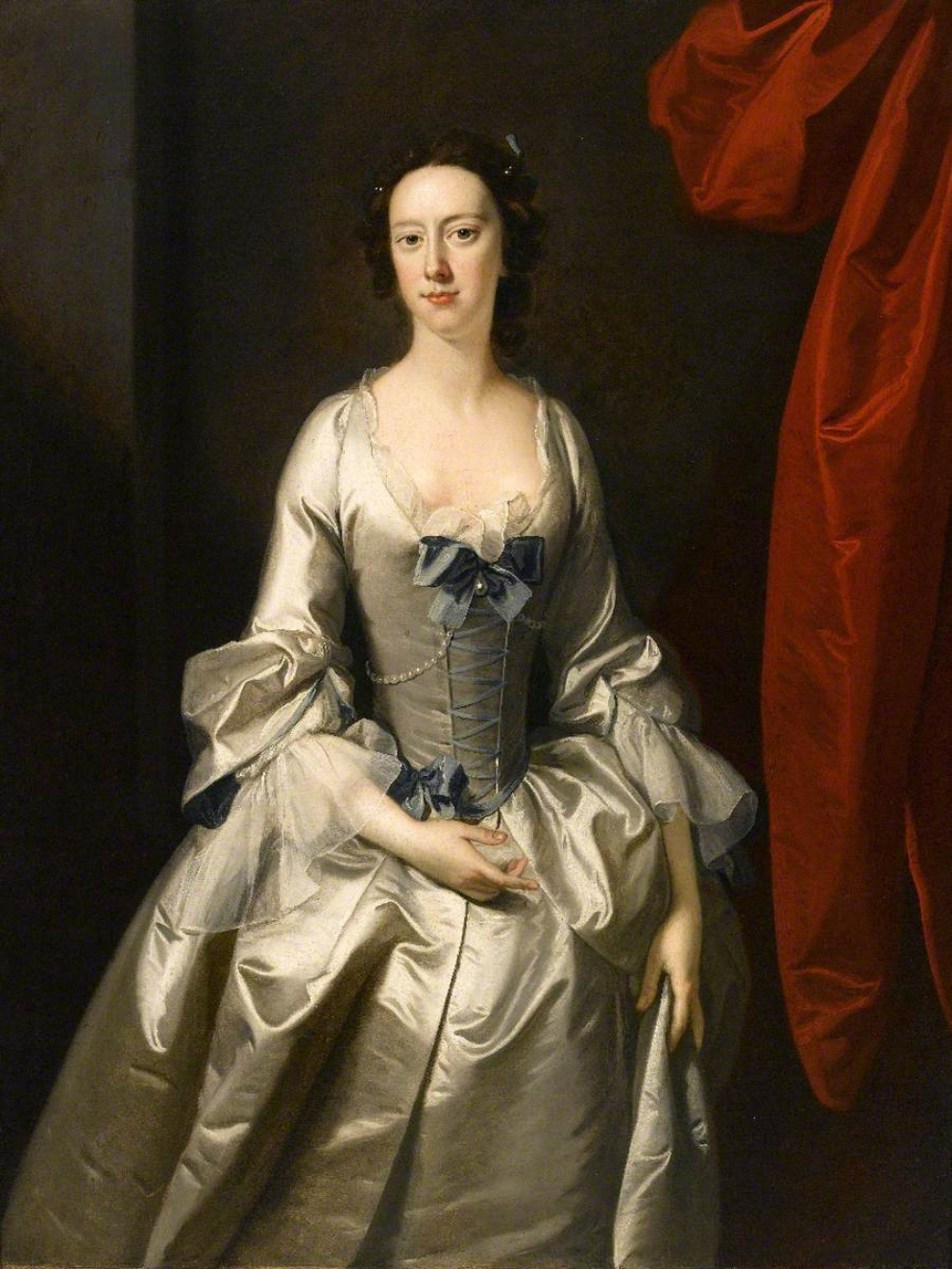
Anne van Keppel, 1742-1748
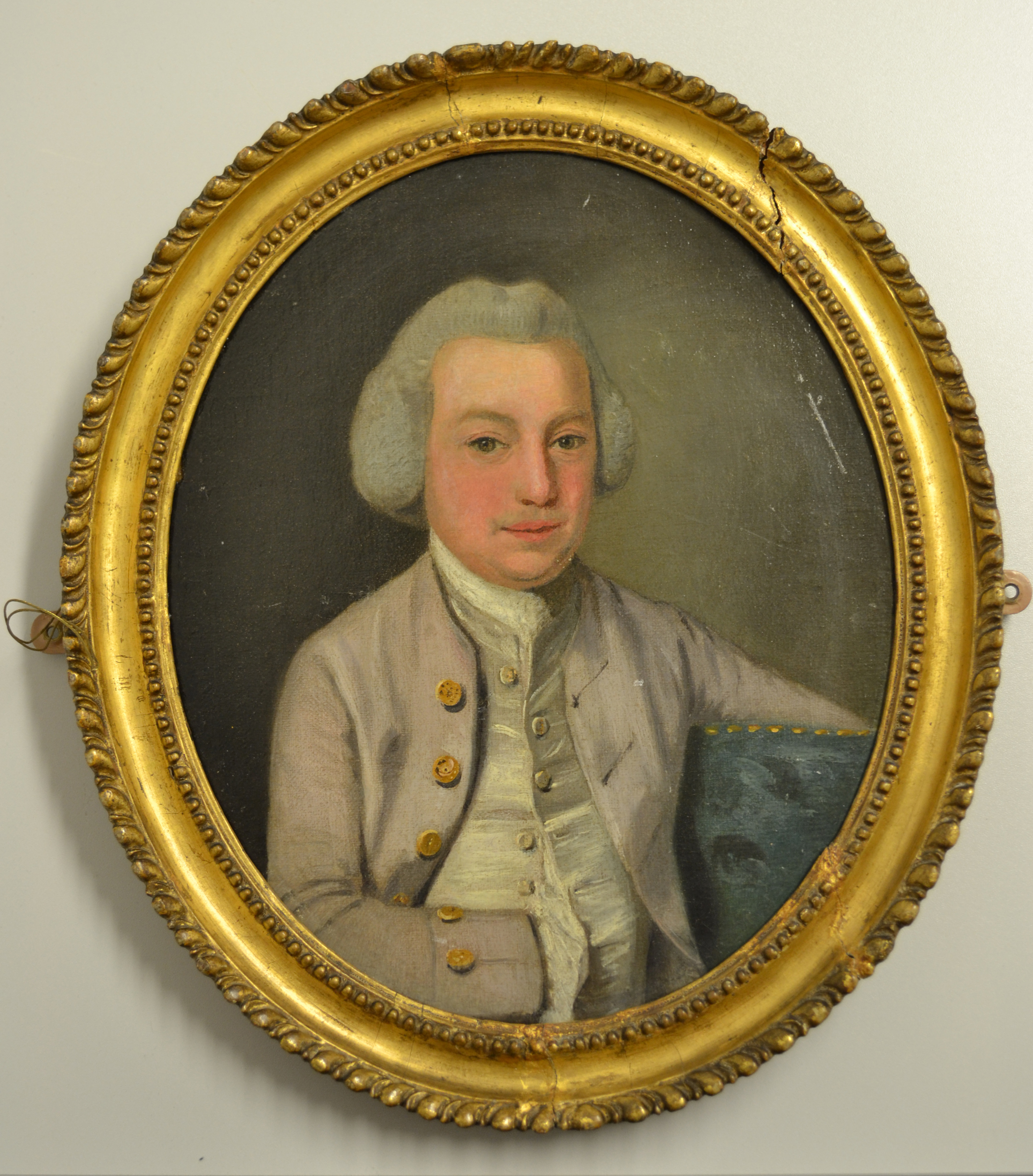
18th century portrait of a man
