= Jonathan Richardson =

English painter (1667–1745)

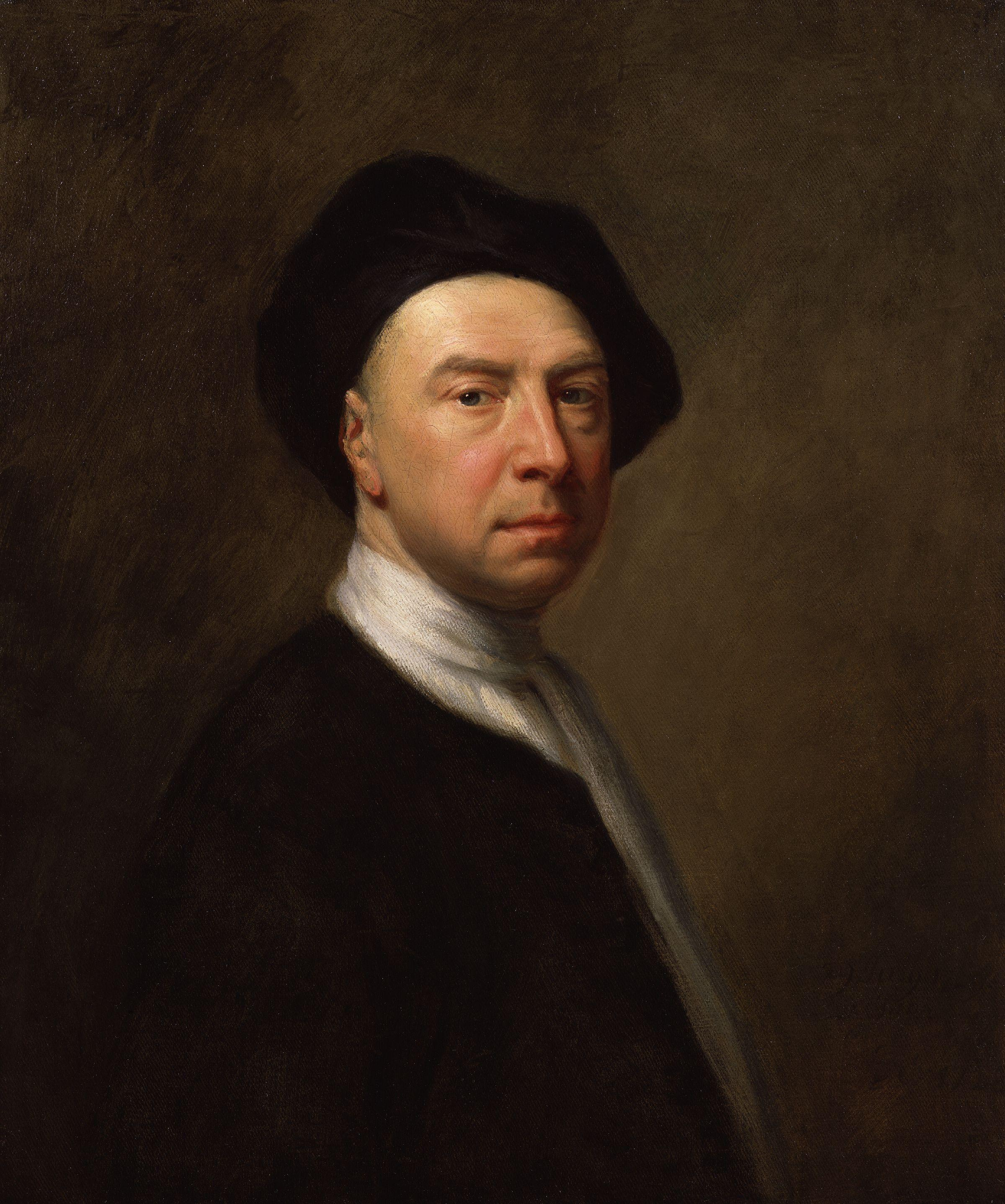
- Self-portrait, 1729
- Born: 12 January 1667; London, England
- Died: 28 May 1745 (aged 78); Bloomsbury, London, England

Jonathan Richardson (12 January 1667 – 28 May 1745), sometimes called "the Elder" to distinguish him from his son, was an English artist, collector of drawings and writer on art, working almost entirely as a portrait-painter in London. He was considered by some art-critics as one of the three foremost painters of his time. He was the master of Thomas Hudson and George Knapton. Richardson was even more influential as a writer; he is credited with inspiring Joshua Reynolds to paint and theorise with his book An Essay on the Theory of Painting. This book is credited with being "the first significant work of artistic theory in English."

== Life ==
Richardson was born in the parish of St. Botolph, Bishopsgate in London on 12 January 1667 to William and Mary Richardson. In 1672 his father died and his mother married again. Richardson became a scrivener's apprentice, but he was released early when his master retired. Richardson was lucky enough to be taken on as a painting apprentice by John Riley. He learnt the art of portraiture from Riley whilst living at his master's house. Richardson's wife was Riley's niece.

Richardson was even more influential as a writer than as a painter according to Samuel Johnson. He is credited with inspiring Joshua Reynolds to paint and theorise with his 1715 book An Essay on the Theory of Painting. In 1722, Richardson published with his son, also Jonathan (1694–1771), An Account of Some of the Statues, Bas-Reliefs, Drawings, and Pictures in Italy (1722). The book was compiled by Richardson the elder using material gathered by his son whilst touring Italy in 1720. This was a very popular book and was used by young men as a basis for their Grand Tour. It was said that the book became the basis for future purchases of art by wealthy collectors and therefore shaped English interest in foreign old masters. It also provided an important model for Johann Joachim Winckelmann's History of Art (1764). Richardson and his son also co-authored their Explanatory Notes and Remarks on Milton's Paradise Lost (1734). These notes are, in part, a response to Richard Bentley's 1732 edition of Paradise Lost, in which he frequently faults Milton's style or places exceptionable passages in square brackets, claiming they are the work of another hand. The Richardsons' responses to Bentley helped to lay the foundation for subsequent interpretation of the poem.

== Legacy ==
Richardson was considered as one of the three foremost painters of his time with Charles Jervas and Michael Dahl. He was also an excellent and prolific draughtsman, and made a number of chalk drawings of friends and family, often using blue paper for them. Recent research has shed light also on his activity as a printmaker, once again mostly in the field of portraiture. He was the master of Thomas Hudson and George Knapton. He painted, drew and etched many self-portraits, which are highly regarded today. Richardson has over 120 paintings in public ownership in the United Kingdom.

When the elder Richardson died in Bloomsbury on 28 May 1745 he left four daughters, one of whom married Thomas Hudson the painter, who had previously been Richardson's pupil. He was also survived by his son, Jonathan Richardson the Younger (1694–1771), who was brought up as a gentleman; he dabbled in painting and printmaking. Horace Walpole stated that he "painted a little" but whatever works he created are now lost. He left a large and valuable collection of 4,749 Old Master drawings which were auctioned by Sotheby's over eighteen days. Another large collection of painting, prints, drawings, etc. (1241 lots in all) was auctioned by Christopher Cock over eighteen evenings from 22 January to 11 February 1747. Today a drawing that still bears Richardson's collector's mark gains substantially in value. Richardson has been described as one of the "greatest collectors of drawings of all time."

== Written works ==
- An Essay on the Theory of Painting (1715)
- An Essay on the Whole Art of Criticism as it Relates to Painting and an Argument in Behalf of the Science of a Connoisseur (1719)
- An Account of Some of the Statues, Bas-Reliefs, Drawings, and Pictures in Italy (1722)
- Explanatory notes and remarks on Milton's Paradise lost By J. Richardson, father and son. With the life of the author, and a discourse on the poem.

== Gallery ==
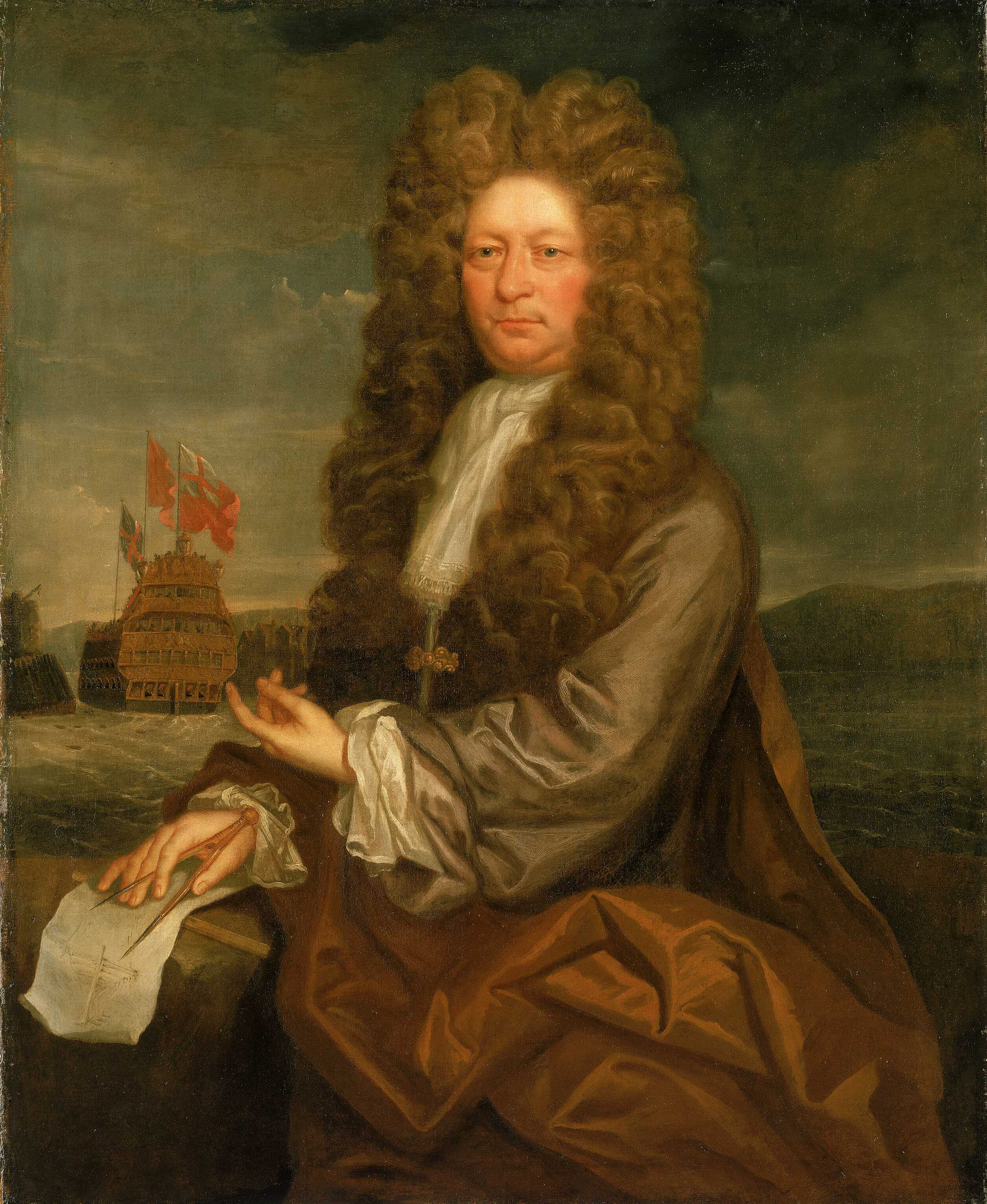
Fisher Harding (1701)

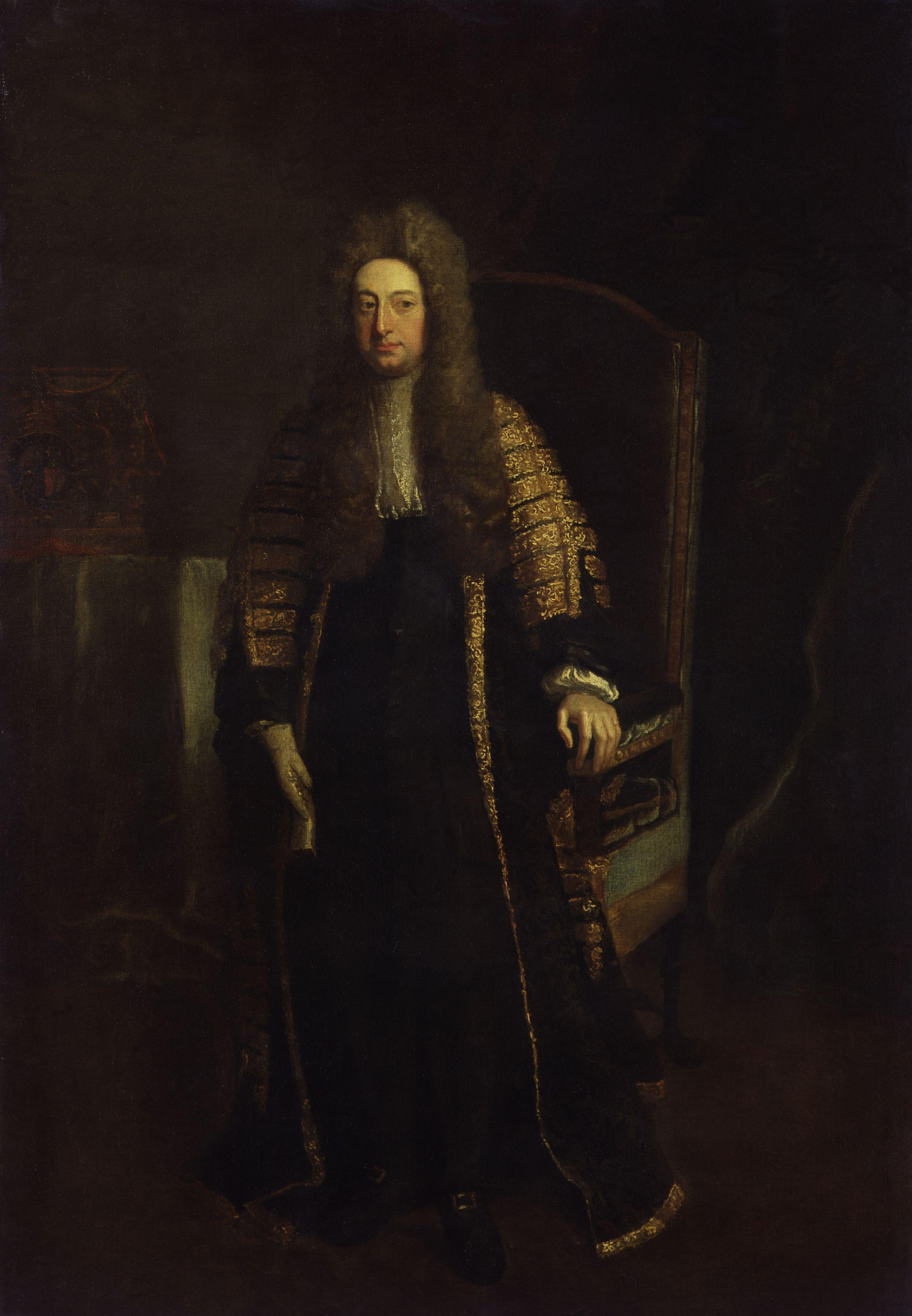
William Cowper, 1st Earl Cowper (c. 1710)

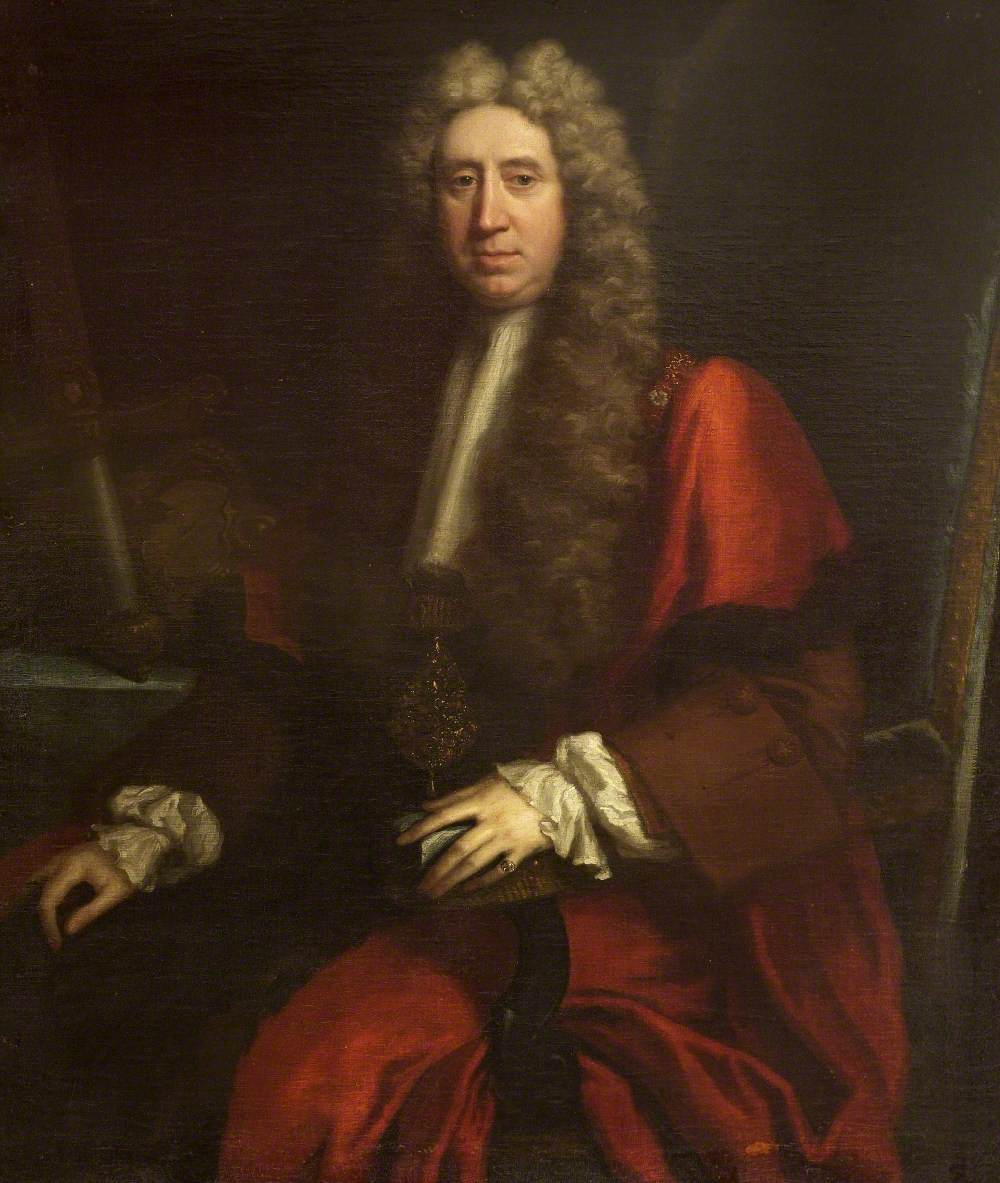
Sir Richard Hoare (c. 1712)

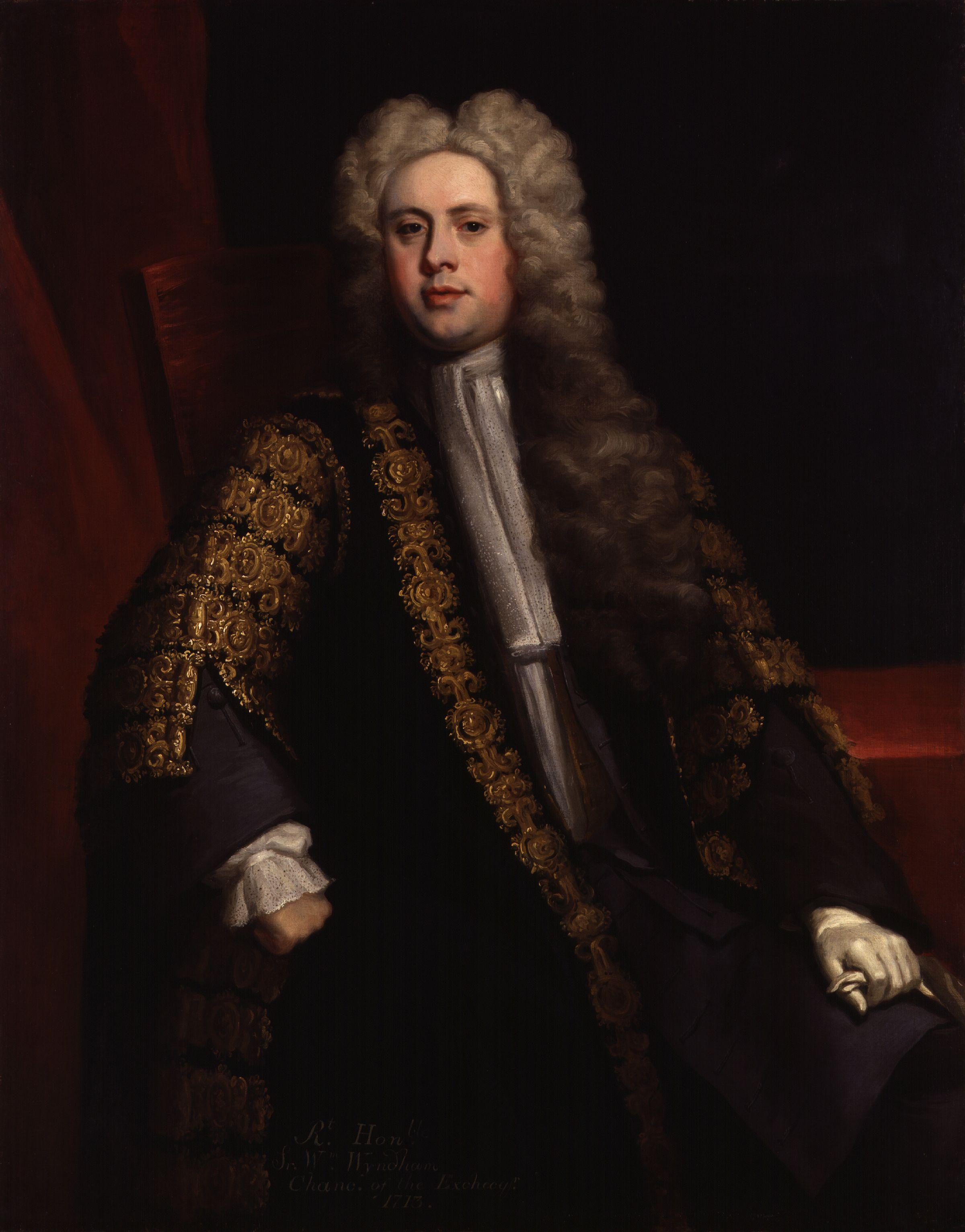
Sir William Wyndham, 3rd Baronet (c. 1713–1714)

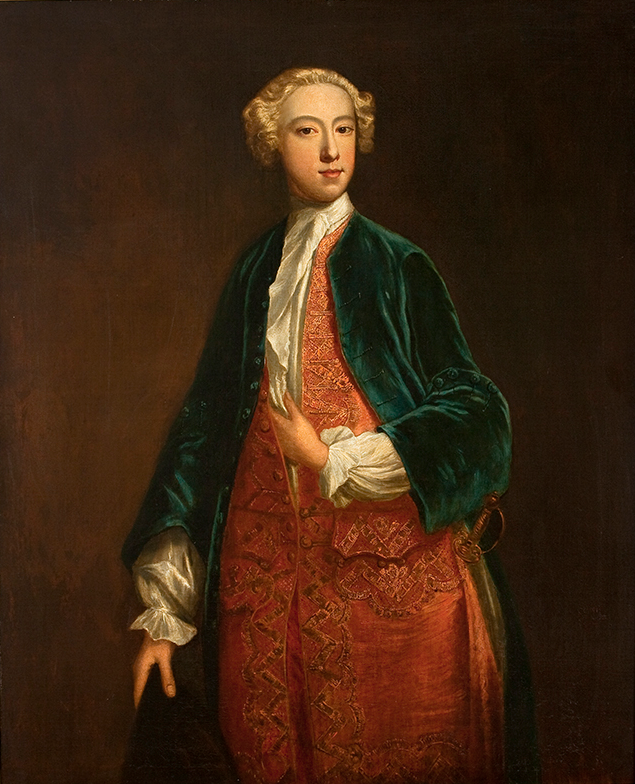
Horace Walpole (1735)

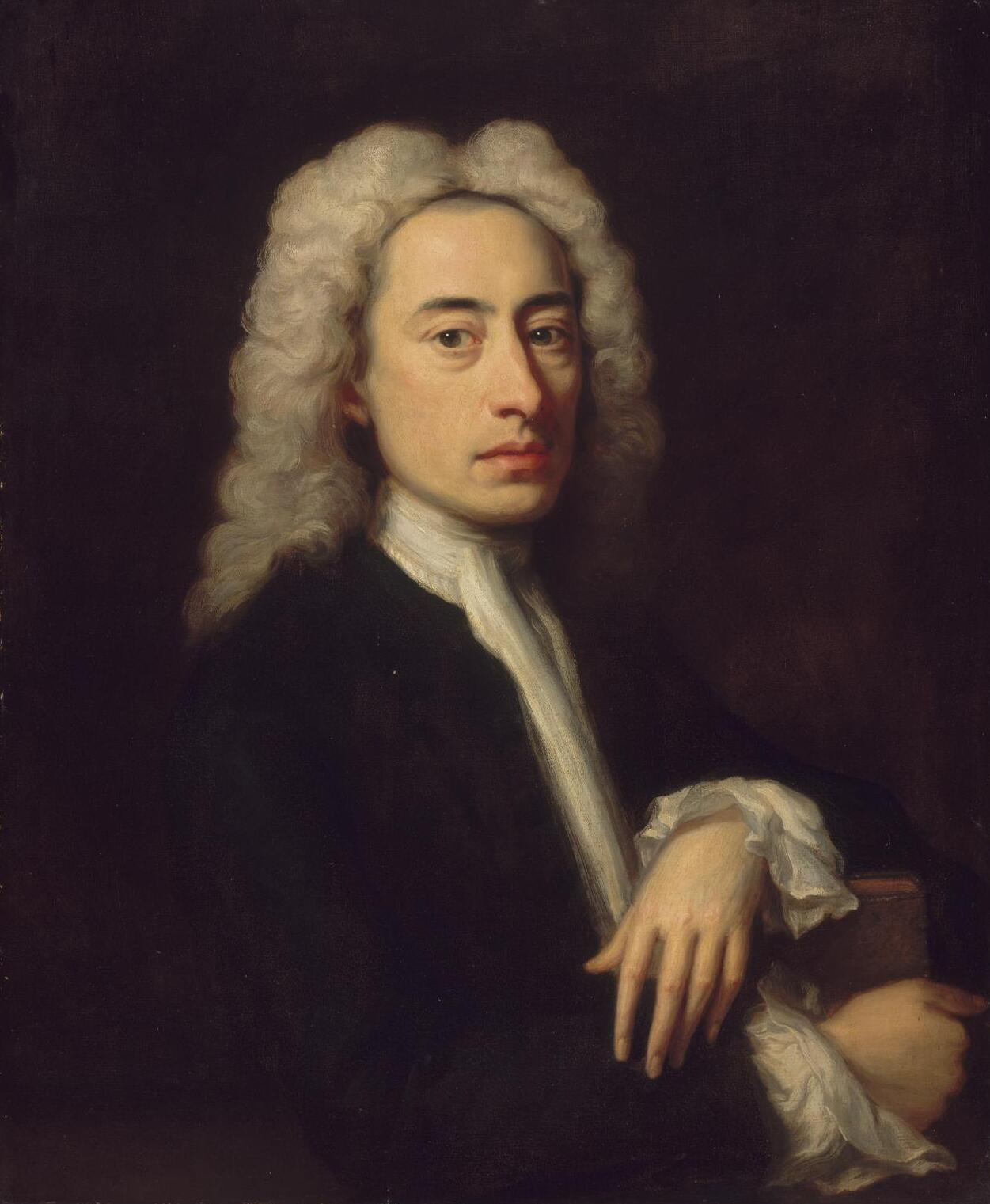
Alexander Pope (c. 1736)

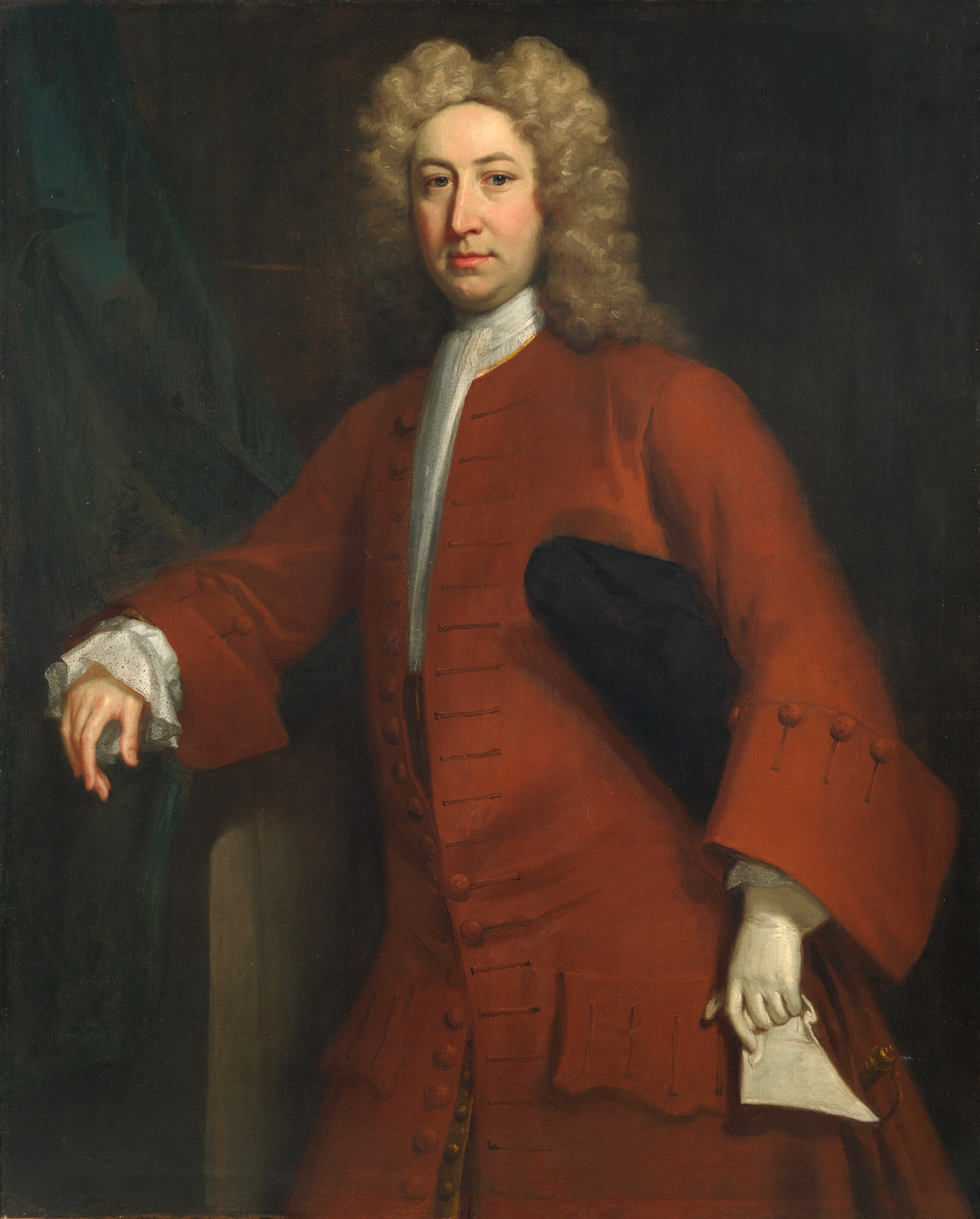
Thomas Fanshawe (c. 1736)
