= Portrait of William Shirley =

Painting by Thomas Hudson

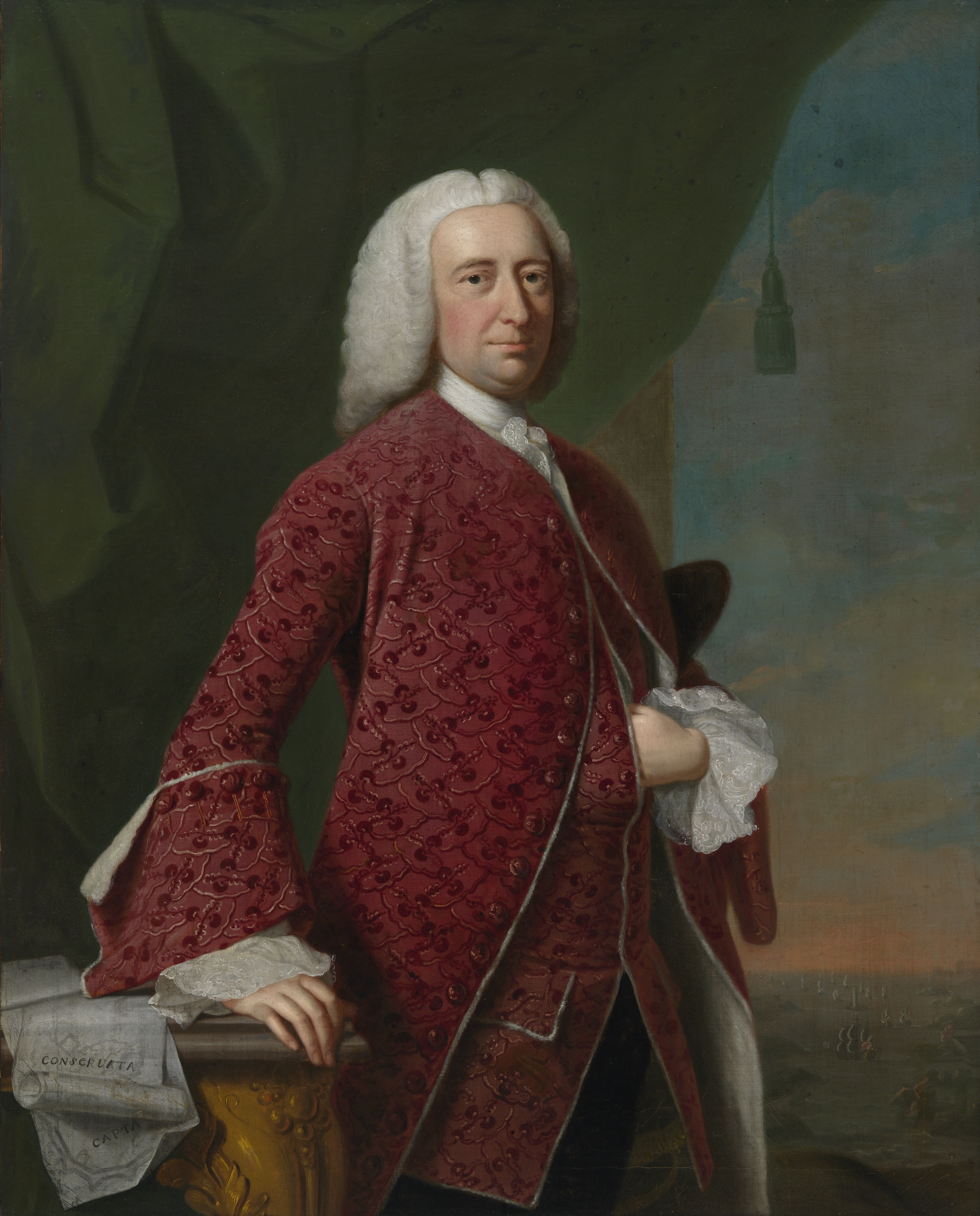
- Artist: Thomas Hudson
- Year: 1750
- Type: Oil on canvas, portrait painting
- Dimensions: 127 cm × 101.6 cm (50 in × 40.0 in)
- Location: National Portrait Gallery; Washington D.C.

Portrait of William Shirley is an oil on canvas portrait painting by the British artist Thomas Hudson, from 1750. It is held at the National Portrait Gallery, in Washington, D.C..

== History and description ==
It depicts the English colonial official William Shirley. He twice served as Governor of Massachusetts and in 1744 he organised the successful expedition to capture Louisbourg during King George's War. The ships in the background make refenfe to this victory.

Shirley sat for this portrait during his return to England before his second spell in Massachusetts and it was then shipped out to Boston. In 1755 he succeeded Edward Braddock as Commander-in-Chief for North America during a new war against the French. However concerns about his lack of military experience led to his replacement the following year.

Hudson was a leading portraitist of early Georgian Britain, whose pupils around this time included Joshua Reynolds and Joseph Wright of Derby. The painting is now in the National Portrait Gallery of the Smithsonian Institution, in Washington D.C., which purchased it in 1979.

== Bibliography ==
- Anderson, Fred. The War That Made America; A Short History of the French and Indian War. Penguin Publishing Group, 2006.
- Barratt, Carrie Rebora . John Singleton Copley in America. John Singleton Copley in America. Metropolitan Museum of Art, 1995.
