= Jonathan Richardson the Younger =

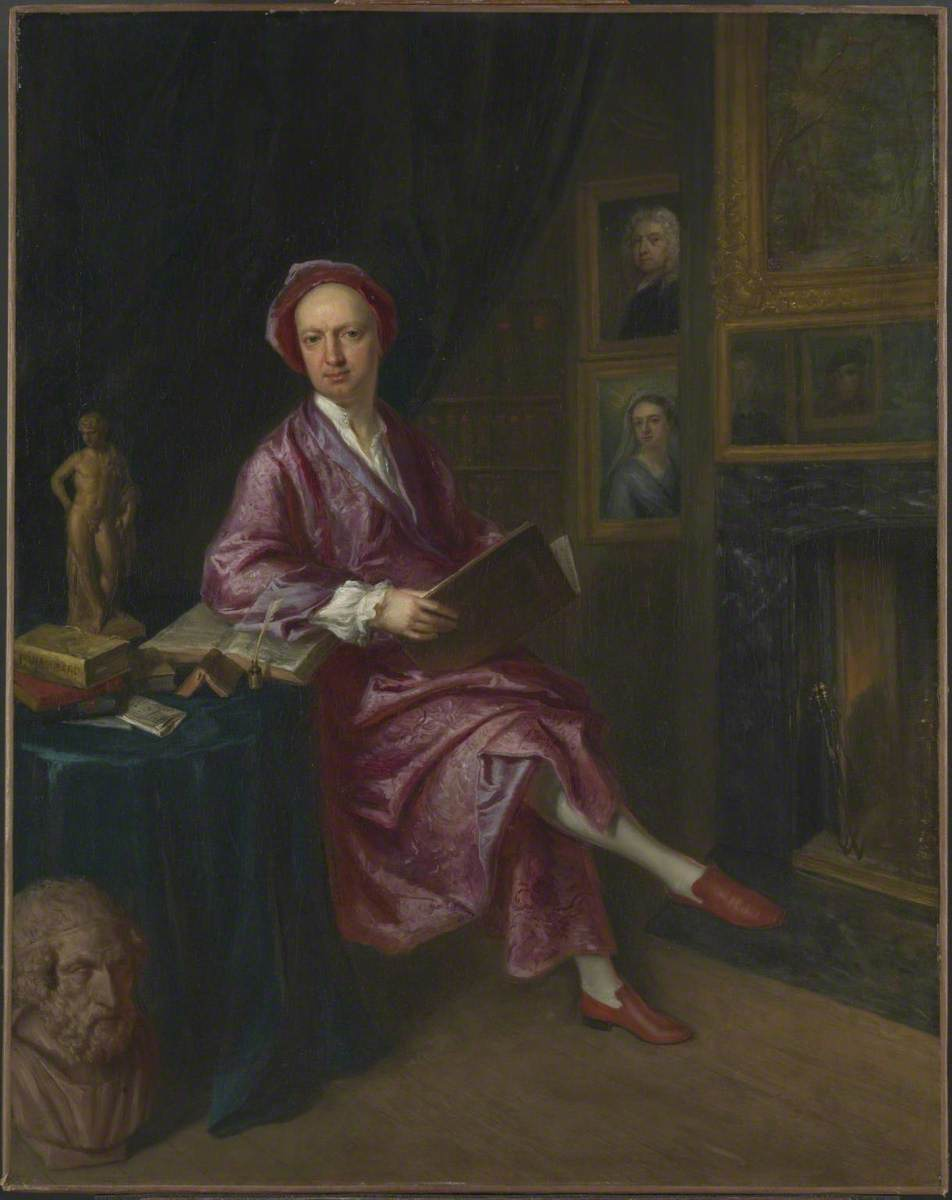
Portrait of the Artist's Son, Jonathan Richardson the Younger, in his Study by Jonathan Richardson the Elder, 1734 (Tate Britain).

Jonathan Richardson the Younger (1694 - 6 June 1771) was an English painter, so-called to distinguish him from his father, tutor and fellow painter Jonathan Richardson the Elder.

He was a frequent portrait subject for his father, with two such drawings now being in the Courtauld Gallery,, one in Yale Center for British Art, one in the Victoria and Albert Museum and a painting in Tate Britain The elder artist called his son "his other self" and collaborated with him on a portrait of Henry Hare, 3rd Baron Coleraine (Society of Antiquaries of London) and written works.

The younger artist's autograph works included portraits of subjects including John Theophilus Desaguliers (History of Science Museum) and Alexander Pope (Fitzwilliam Museum and Victoria Art Gallery). Drawings by him of his father and of Hans Sloane were recorded as being in the British Museum by the 1885-1900 Dictionary of National Biography.

He was also an art collector, with three works previously owned by him now in the Getty Museum. He died in Queen Square, Bloomsbury and was buried near his father in the churchyard of St George the Martyr, Bloomsbury and soon after his death his book Richardsoniana, or Occasional Reflections on the Moral Nature of Man, suggested by various Authors, ancient and modern, and exemplified from these Authors, with several Anecdotes interspersed, by the late Jonathan Richardson, jun., Esq. was published.

== Gallery ==
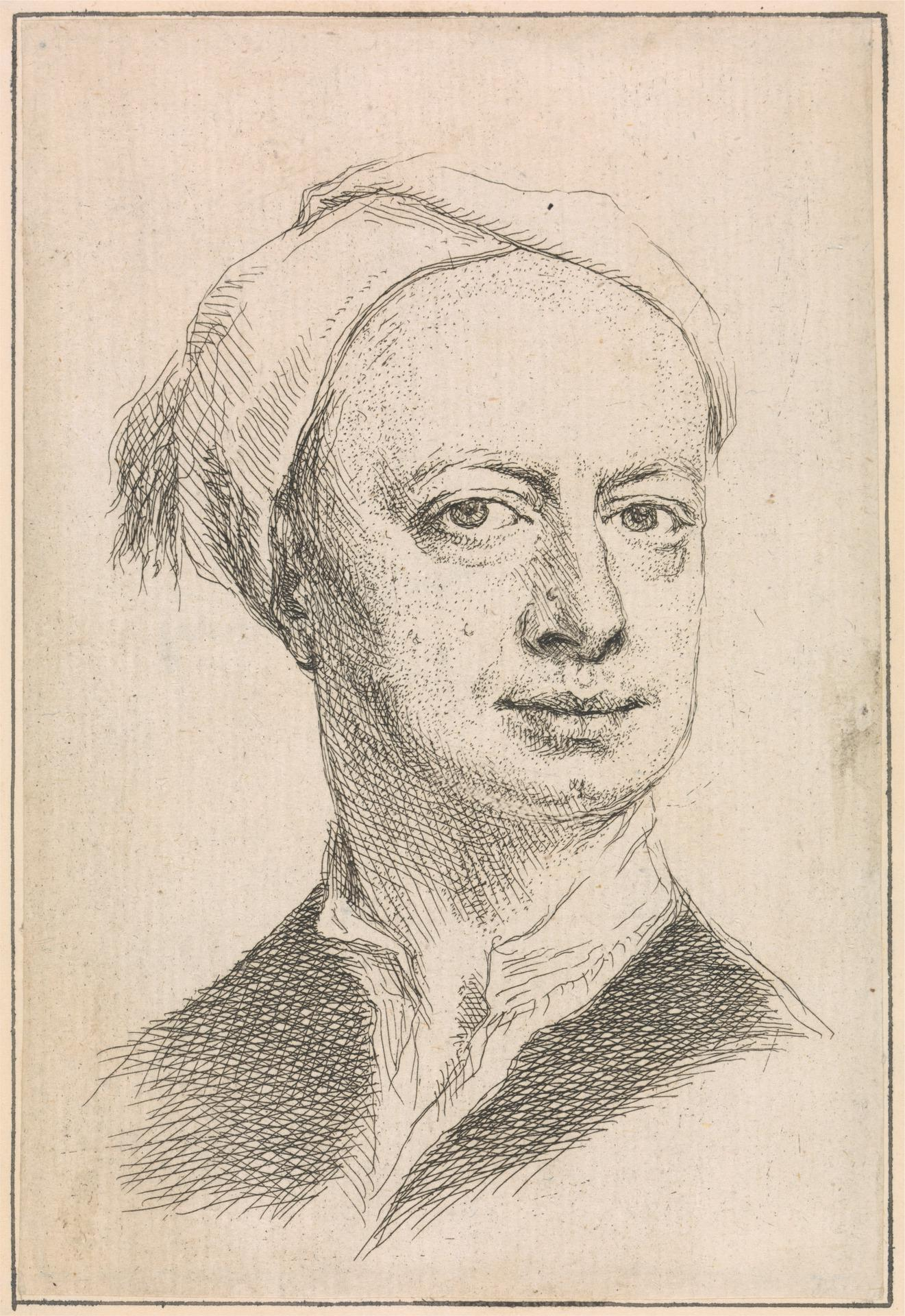
Self-portrait

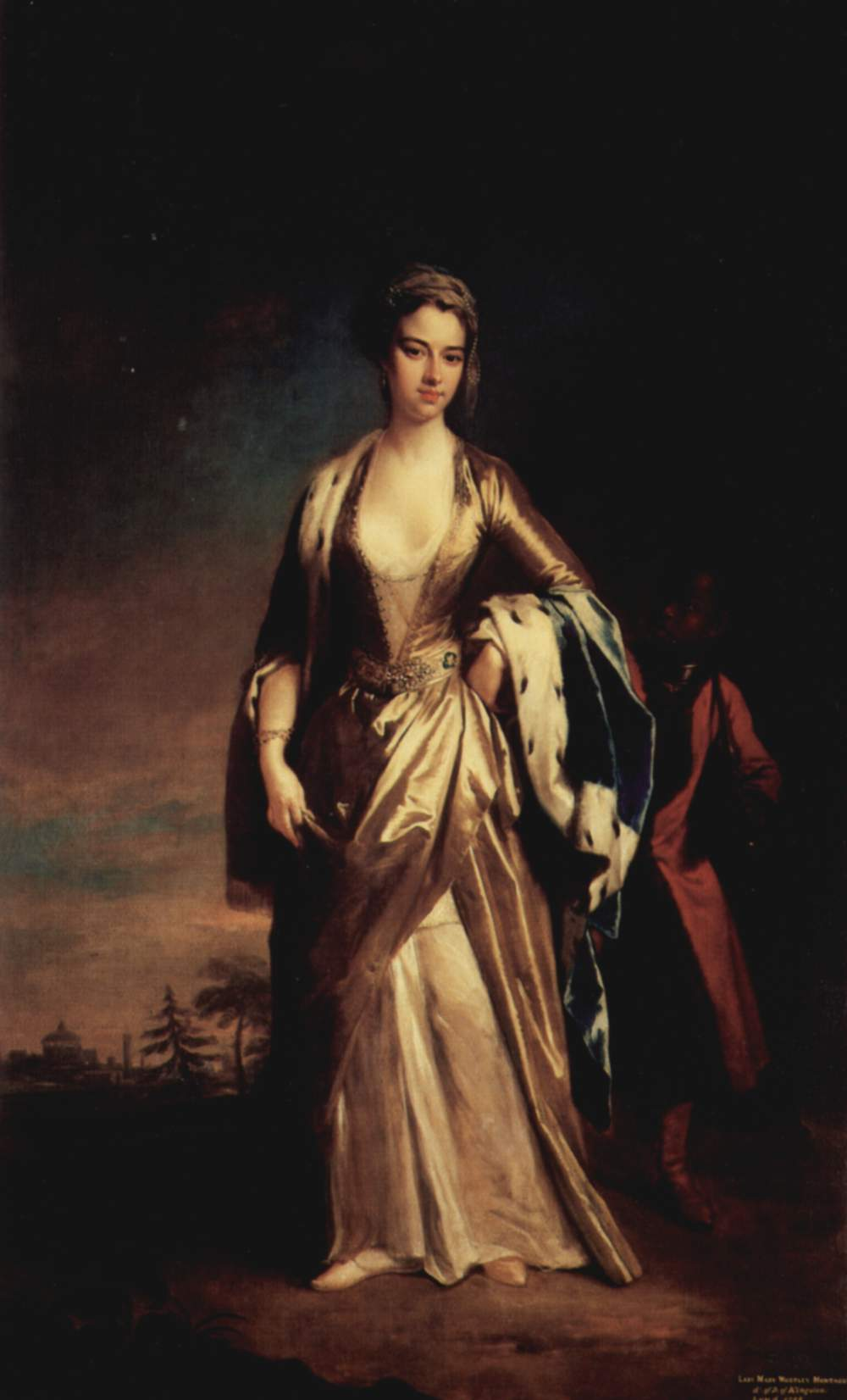
Lady Mary Wortley Montagu

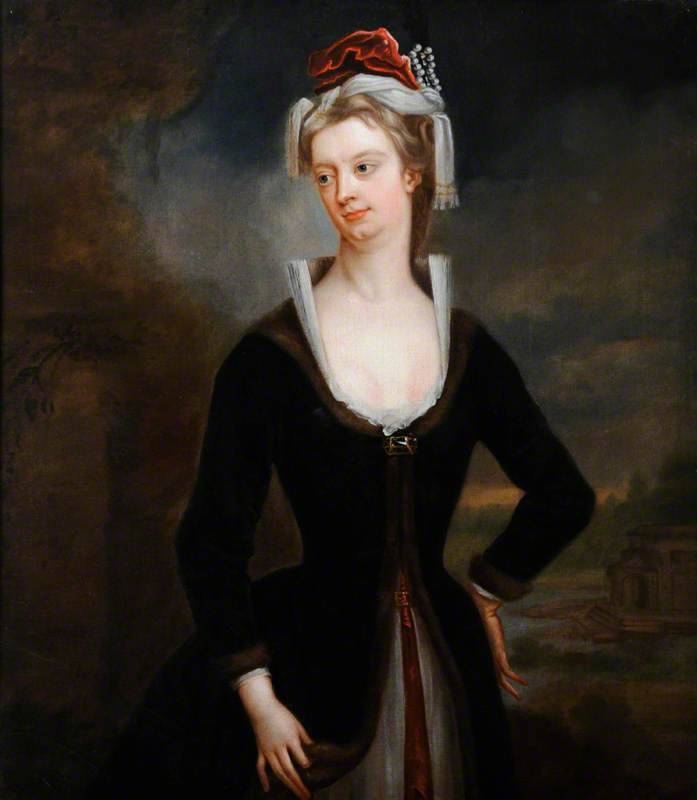
Lady Mary Wortley Montagu (attributed to Richardson)

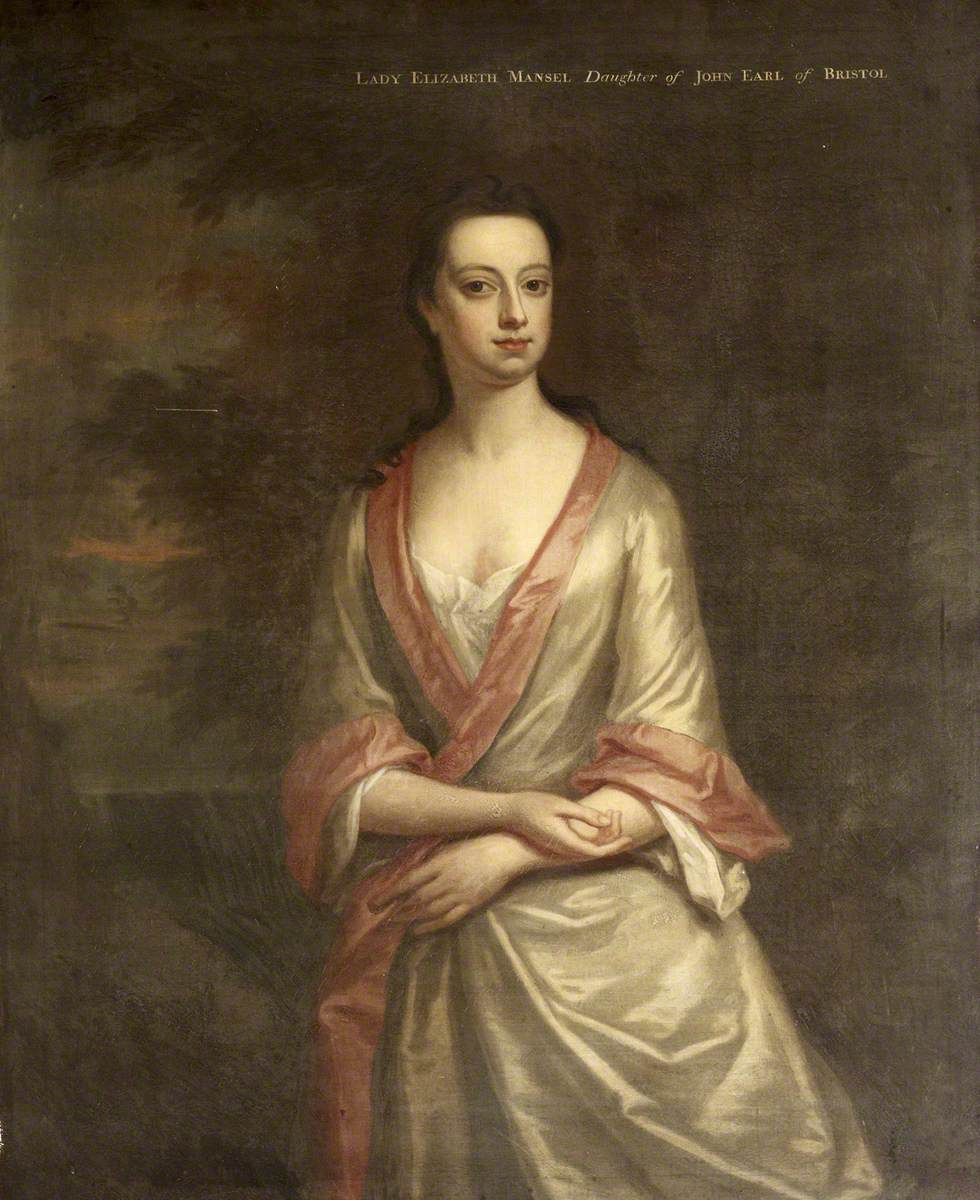
Lady Elizabeth Hervey (1697–1727), Lady Mansel (John Fayam, after Richardson)
