= Cana (disambiguation) =

Cana of Galilee is a village mentioned in the Gospel of John.

Cana or Caña or CANA may also refer to:

== People ==
- Iñaki Caña (born 1975), Spanish football player and coach
- Kelvin Caña (born 1987), Venezuelan épée fencer
- Lorik Cana (born 1983), Albanian footballer

== Places ==
=== United States ===
- Cana, California
- Cana, Texas
- Cana, Virginia
- Cana Island, in Lake Michigan, Wisconsin

=== Other places ===
- Cana, Benin
  - Cana Airport
- Rural Municipality of Cana No. 214, Saskatchewan, Canada
- Cana, Tuscany, Italy
- Čaňa, Slovakia
- Cana, Yemen, ancient port city, now Bir Ali
- La Caña, a district of Los Ríos, Distrito Nacional, Dominican Republic

== Science and technology ==
- Cana (radiolarian), an extinct genus
- Cana (unit), unit of measurement
- cana, a word commonly used in systematic names of organisms

== Other uses ==
- Cana, a Coahuiltecan tribe
- Caña (Chilean slang), a hangover
- Caña, a flamenco form similar to the polo
- Cãna Cachaça, a Brazilian alcoholic spirit brand
- Baston (weapon), or caña
- Orujo, or caña, a pomace brandy from Spain
- Africa Aquatics, formerly African Swimming Confederation (Confédération Africaine de Natation, CANA)
- Argentine Naval Aviation , sometimes referred to as CANA
- Caribbean News Agency
- Convulsive Antidote, Nerve Agent, a United States military specialized preparation of Diazepam
- Convocation of Anglicans in North America, now reformed as Church of Nigeria North American Mission

== See also ==
- Canae, in classical antiquity a city in ancient Aeolis, modern-day Turkey
- Cane (disambiguation)
- Canas (disambiguation)
- Canna (disambiguation)
- Cannae (disambiguation)
- Flor de Caña (disambiguation)
- Kana (disambiguation)
- Kanah, a toponym used in two contexts in the Bible
- Punta Cana, a town in the Dominican Republic
- Qana (Cana, Canna, Kana), municipality in southern Lebanon
- Sugarcane
- Tel Qana, archaeological site in the West Bank
- Wadi Qana, in the West Bank and Israel
- Wedding at Cana (disambiguation)
