= Saint Mark (Tzanes) =

Painting by Emmanuel Tzanes

- Μάρκος ο Ευαγγελιστής (Greek), San Marco (Italian)
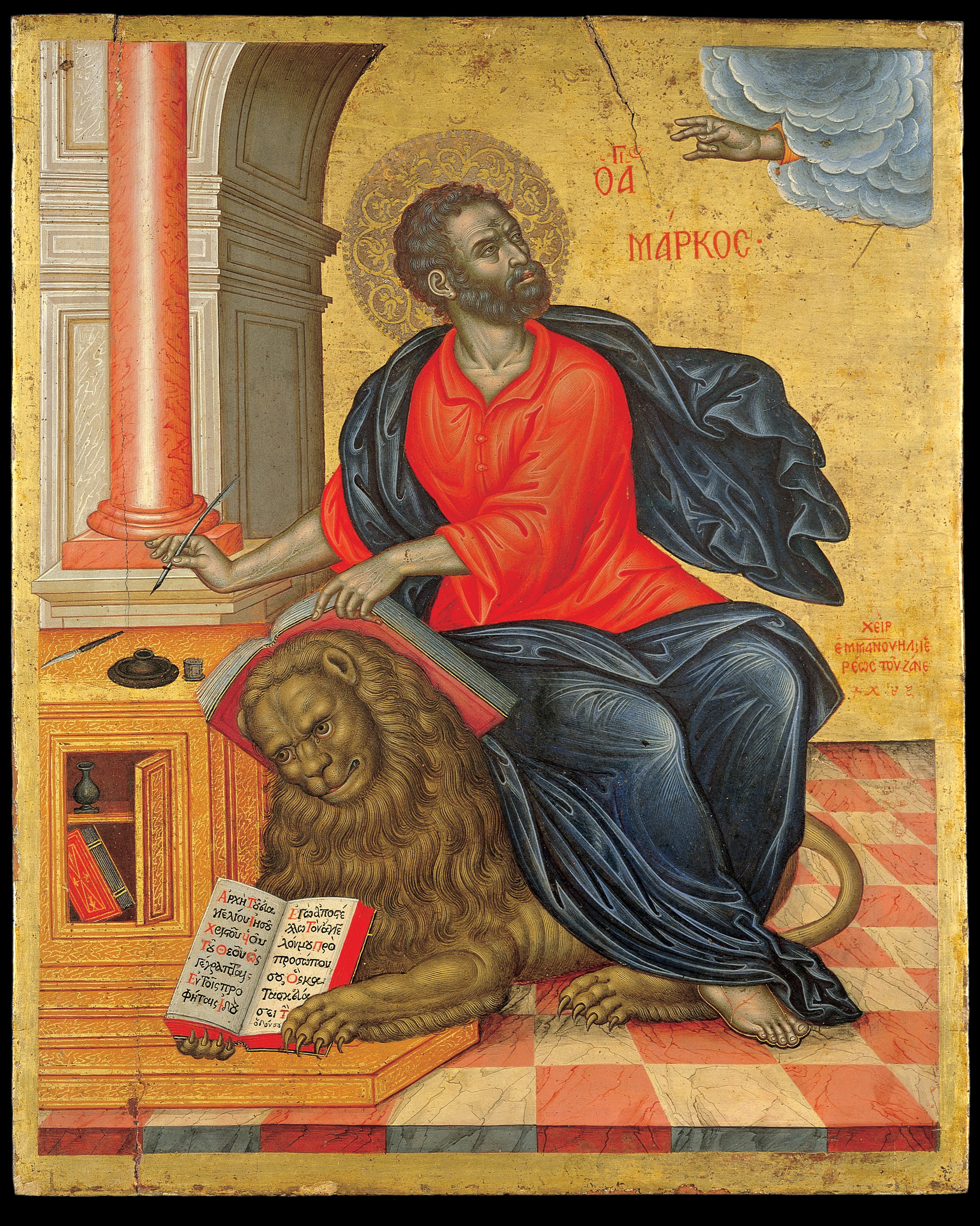
- Artist: Emmanuel Tzanes
- Year: c. 1657
- Medium: tempera on wood
- Movement: Late Cretan School
- Subject: Saint Mark with a Lion
- Dimensions: 66 cm × 54 cm (26 in × 21.2 in)
- Location: Benaki Museum, Athens, Greece
- Owner: Benaki Museum
- Website: Official Website

Saint Mark is a tempera-on-wood painting created c. 1657 by Emmanuel Tzanes. Tzanes was a Cretan painter who migrated to Corfu and Venice. He settled in Venice with his brothers Konstantinos Tzanes and poet Marinos Tzanes. Konstantinos was a famous painter. Their combined existing works number over 150. Emmanuel replaced Greek painter Philotheos Skoufos as the priest of San Giorgio dei Greci.

Saint Mark is the patron saint of Venice. His remains were moved to Venice from Egypt. Countless Italian painters painted the subject matter. He was considered one of the first historiographers of the new Christian religion. He was associated with the Apostle Peter. His gospel consists of collections of miracle stories, controversy stories, parables, and a passion narrative. He founded the first church of Alexandria Egypt.

Saint Mark is often depicted with a Lion. The winged Lion of Saint Mark is a symbol of Venice. The symbol also represents the Greek Orthodox Church of Alexandria. Vittore Carpaccio painted the Lion of Saint Mark. Venetian masters Titian and Tintoretto both created paintings of Saint Mark. Titian's St. Mark Enthroned and Tintoretto's Finding of the Body of Saint Mark were symbols of Venice. Andrea Mantegna also painted his own notable version of St Mark.

St Mark's Basilica is one of the most important churches in Venice. The church stands as an emblem of Saint Mark and the traditional Greek Italian Byzantine style. Two prominent greek painters affiliated with St Mark's Basilica were Thomas Bathas and Nikolaos Philanthropinos. Tzanes's painting is a testimony of the painter's loyalty to his new home. The painting is currently at the Benaki Museum in Athens Greece. The painting was a Gift from Damianos Kyriazis.

== Description ==
The painting was created with egg tempera and gold leaf on wood panel. The icon was created around 1657 in Venice. The height of the painting is 66 cm (26 in) and the width is 54 cm (21.2 in). The painting is one of the signed works of Tzanes. The floor resembles Damaskinos's tiled floors. Both The Last Supper and the Wedding at Cana featured tiled floors in a similar manner. The floor allows viewers to visually establish the foreground, the middle ground, and the background.

Saint Mark sits on his lion. He holds an open book in his left hand and a quill pen in his right. The painter uses bright colors following the Italian cangiante technique. The Saint's dark blue robe floats in mid-air while he looks to his left envisioning the story of Jesus. His robe is painted with dark and light blue colors. The painter creates the perfect illusion of shadows. His bright orange shirt folds naturally. The painter adds human anatomical features to Mark, his veins are clearly visible. Mark's face gazes into space and the painter clearly expresses his facial features. His nose, mouth, and eyes appear to establish space. The brushstrokes of his beard clearly establish lines, contours, and grooves. The painter clearly reveals his hair waves.

In the upper right corner, the hand of God blesses the evangelist. The cloud is painted with detail. To our left a column and an archway are present. Both are painted with clear lines and shapes. There is a small bookshelf under the column and archway. Inside the bookshelf, a small ink jar and book are visible. The lion is painted in careful detail. The lion's mane is clearly visible, it is curly and wavy. The fur is distinguishable from the rest of the lion's hair. His claws are close to Mark's foot. The lion's claws are carefully painted. The lion has a majestic expression on its face while holding an open book with Greek letters.

== Gallery ==
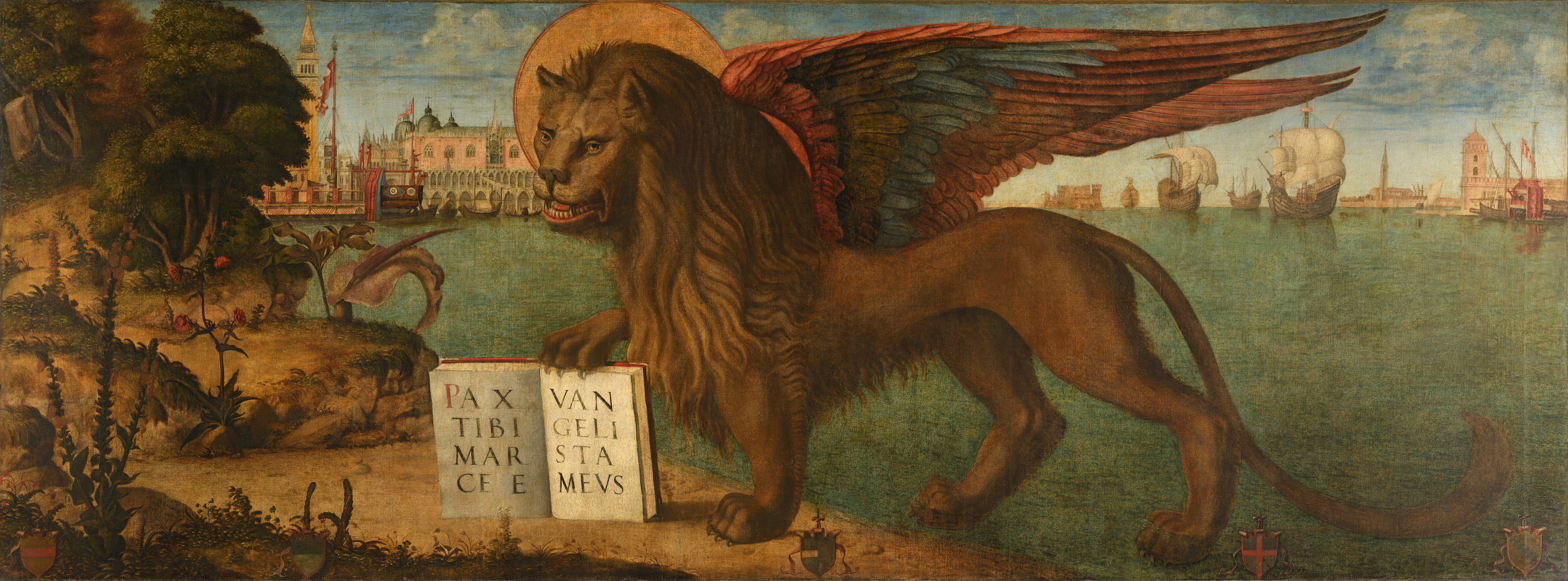
Lion of Saint Mark Carpaccio

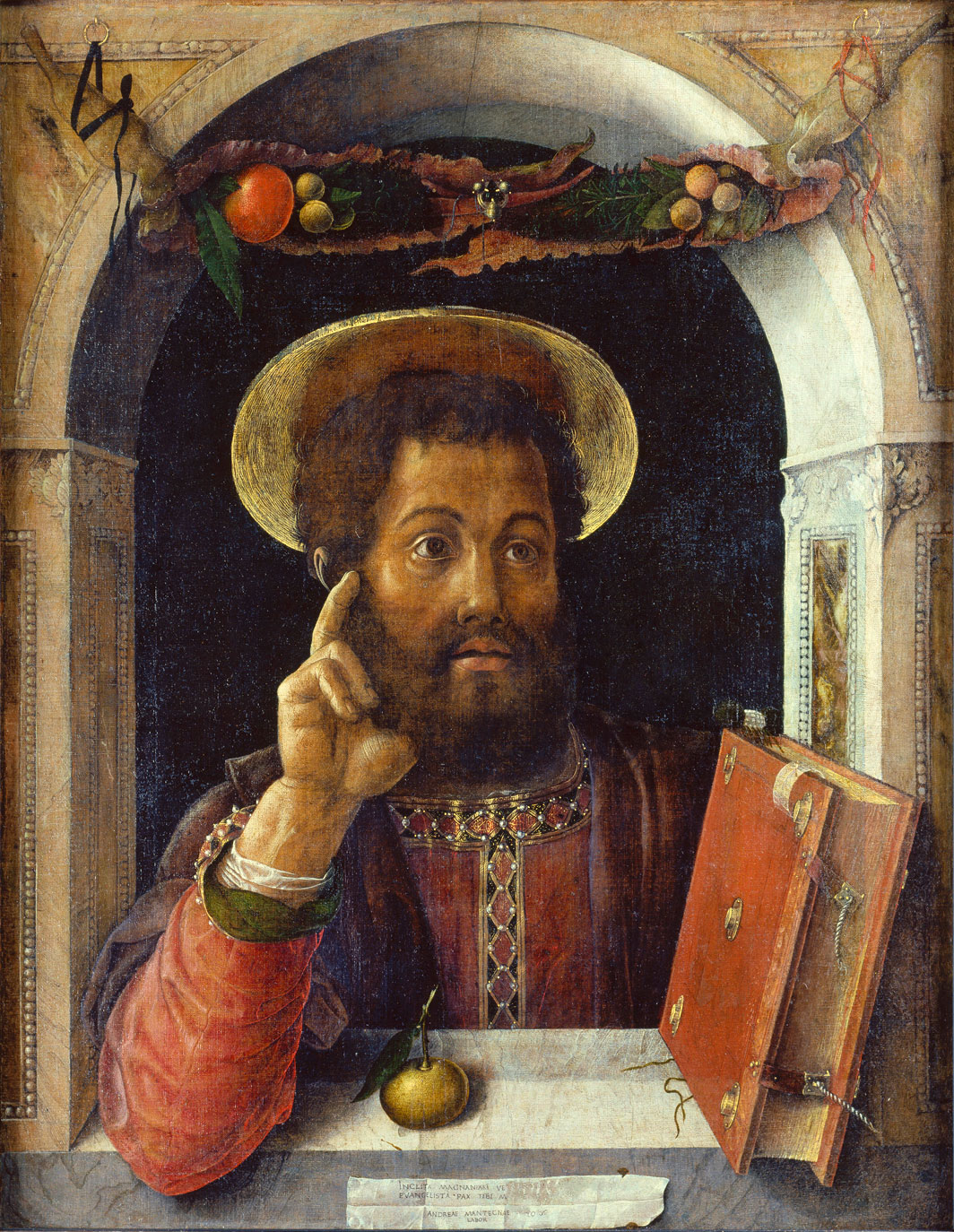
Saint Mark Mantegna

== See also ==
- The Incredulity of Saint Thomas (Tzanes)
