= Adoration of the Kings (Damaskinos) =

Painting by Michael Damaskenos

- Η Προσκύνηση των Μάγων (Greek), L'Adorazione dei Magi (Italian)
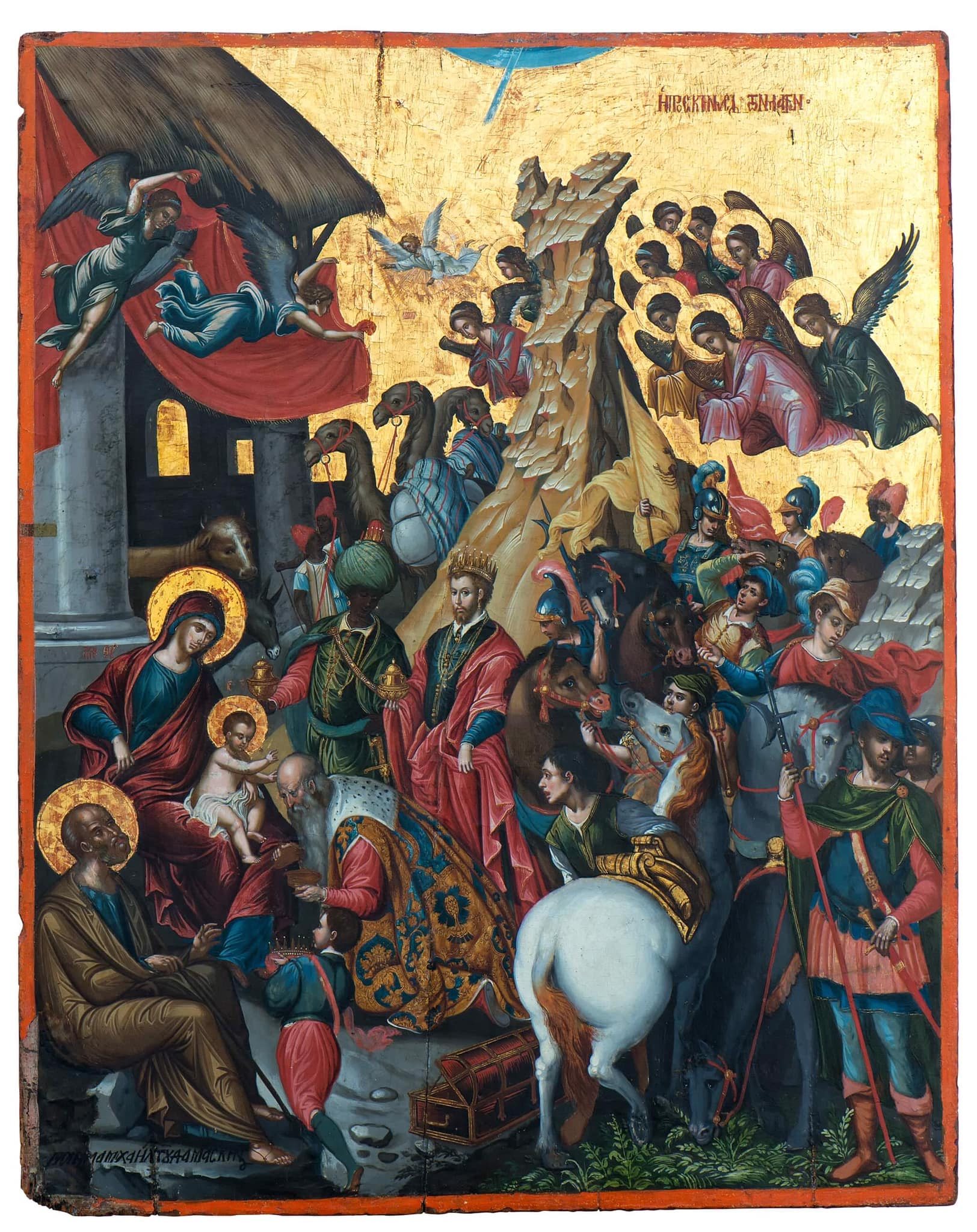
- Artist: Michael Damaskinos
- Year: c. 1586–1591
- Medium: tempera on wood
- Movement: Cretan School
- Subject: Nativity of Jesus
- Dimensions: 110 cm × 85 cm (43.3 in × 33.5 in)
- Location: Monastery of Agia Aikaterini, Heraklion, Crete
- Owner: Collection of Saint Catherine's Monastery Mount Sinai, Egypt

The Adoration of the Kings, also known as the Adoration of the Magi, is a popular tempera painting by Greek painter Michele Damaschino. The painting is roughly the same size as Damaschino's The Last Supper. Both paintings were created around the same period. Michele Damaschino painted in parts of Italy and Greece. He was primarily active in Heraklion, Sicily, and Venice. He is a major representative of the Cretan Renaissance. He was a Cretan Renaissance painter who painted in the Greek mannerisms prevalent at the time. He also blended the style with the Venetian technique creating a new prototype of painting. He was followed by countless artists both Greek and Italian. His version of the Adoration of the Kings reveals the mixture of painting styles prevalent in most of his works. The Adoration of the Kings is now in the Monastery of Agia Aikaterini in Heraklion, Crete. It is part of the collection of Saint Catherine's Monastery at Mount Sinai, Egypt.

== Description ==
The work is egg tempera and gold leaf on wood with dimensions 43.3 in (109.9 cm) x 33.4 in (84.8 cm). It was created toward the end of the 16th century. The central figure is the king. The painter wants to emphasize the importance of the visitors of the newborn king. According to Damaschino's logic, the king is embraced by kings. The viewer's eye has to search for the Virgin and Child. The scene is saturated with important figures namely the three Magi. Two of the Magi are crowned. After establishing the royal hierarchical structure one of the high-ranking nobles kneels before baby Jesus, transferring power to the infant. A young boy is also bringing the young king a crown. The Magi are offering gifts of gold, frankincense, and myrrh, and two are wearing jewelry and earrings.

The entire painting is saturated with figures participating in the nativity scene. Animals adorn the landscape: camels, horses, and cows. A unique donkey sits right behind the Virgin Mary. The kings are dressed in silk robes elaborate striations suggest folds of fabric. The Magi kneeling before the young king is dressed in an elaborate robe with intricate decorations and colors. The king in red may have been Damaschino at a younger age. The painter may have added himself to the scene. The clothing and weapons suggest 16th century Venice. One of the soldiers to the right of the mountain holds a flag representing the king's kingdom.

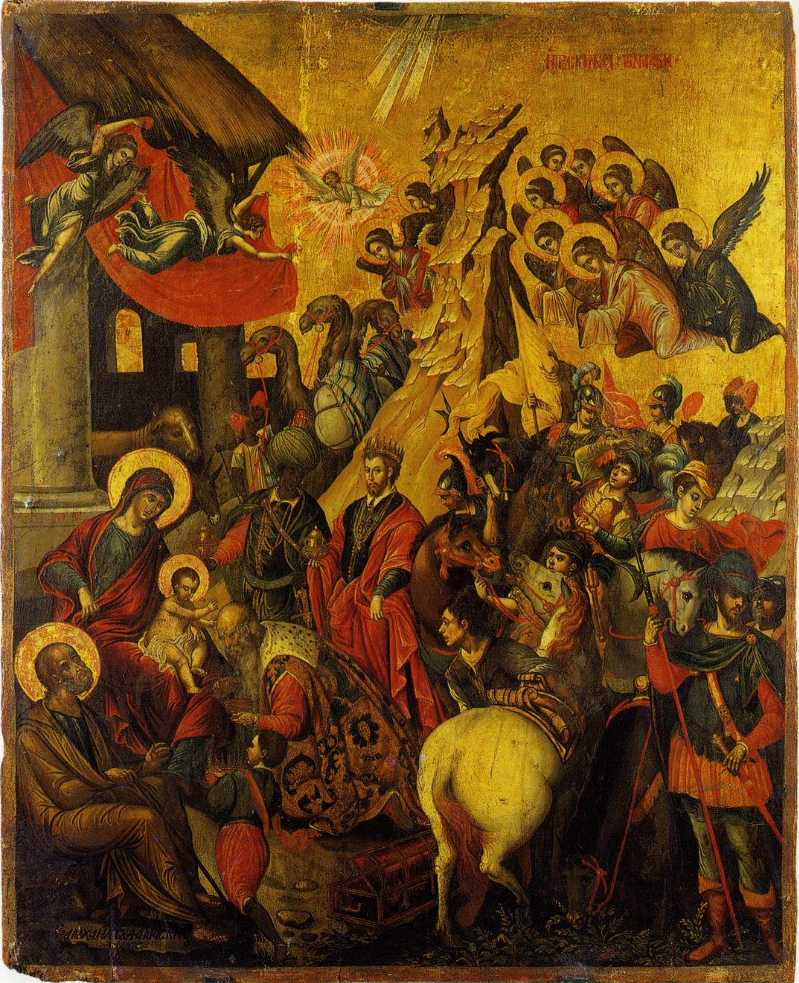
Before Restoration

The tempera painting offers intricate geometric complexity. The picture can be broken down into triangular components. There is a cluster of figures to our right. Damaschino is using the Italian Renaissance cangiante technique. There are an array of colors all over the painting. He clearly illustrates the foreground and the background. He blends Italian Venetian painting with traditional Greek mannerisms creating a proportion of symmetry. The gilded background does not interfere with the painter's ability to establish his unique new style. The new style was the prototype for the next two hundred years of Greek painting.

The painting was recently restored. Regrettably, with every restoration, some parts of the painting become lost. In the restoration of the Sistine Chapel frescoes some of the eyes were lost to the cleaning techniques employed. In the restoration of the Adoration of the Kings, parts of the gilded background were lost namely the pink halo around the angel. The rays from the sun were also lost or severely distorted and not restorable. That was the only visible damage done to the priceless artifact.

== Gallery ==
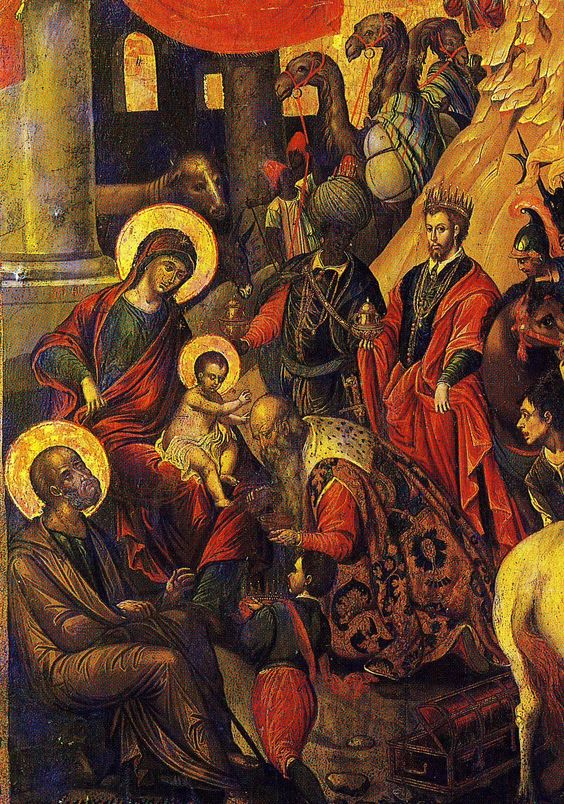
Nativity Scene

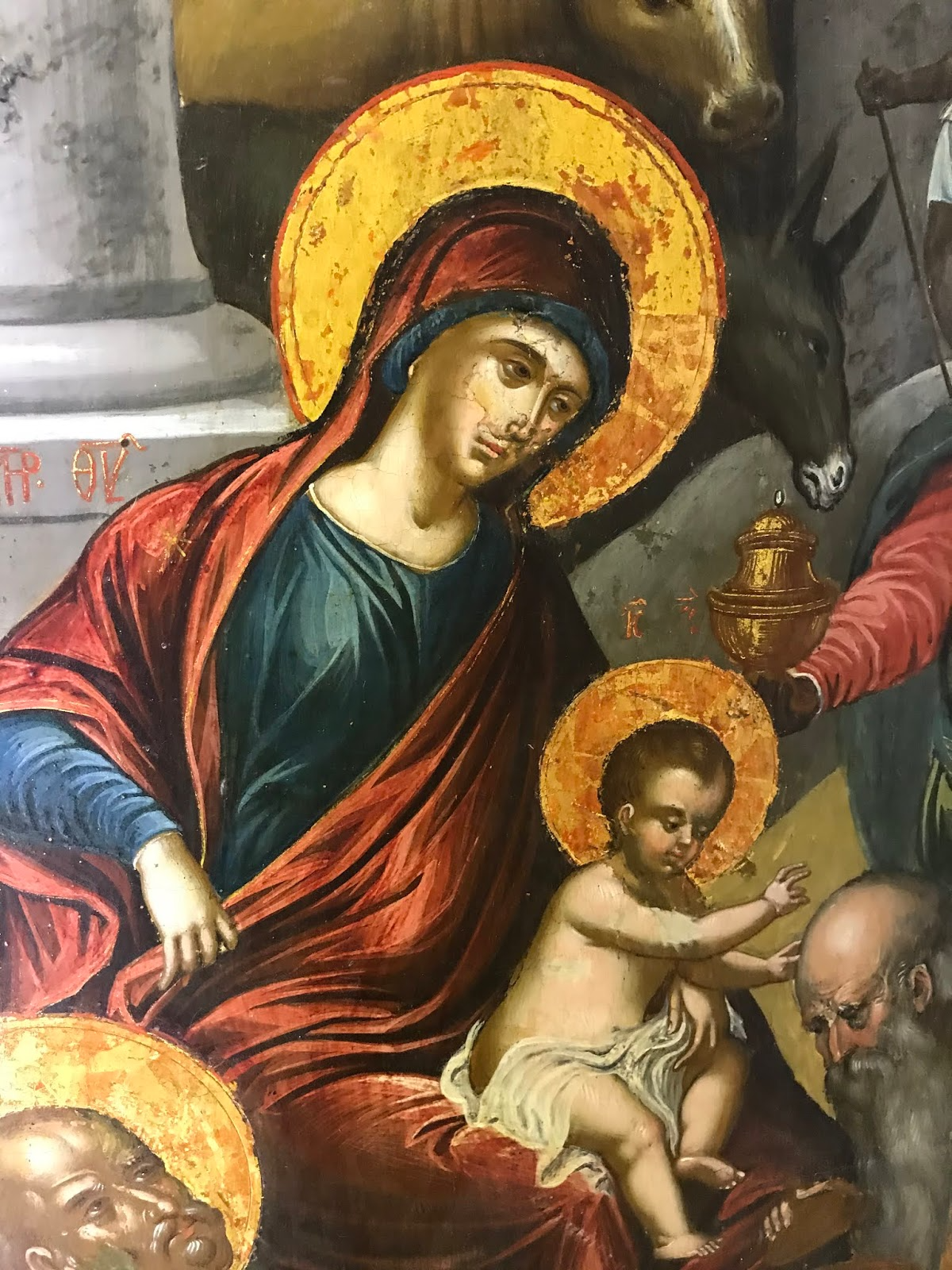
Virgin and Christ

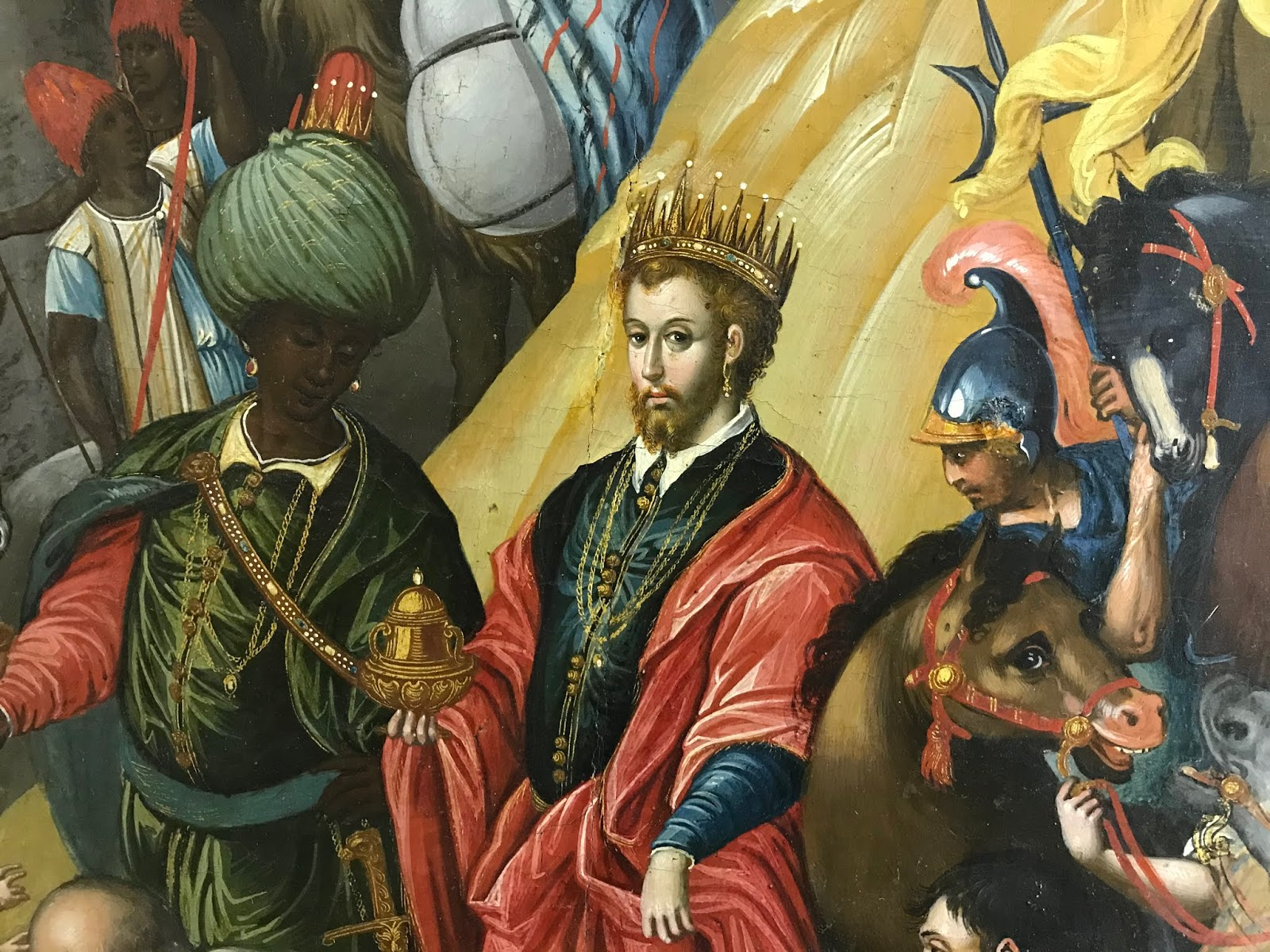
Detail of Kings

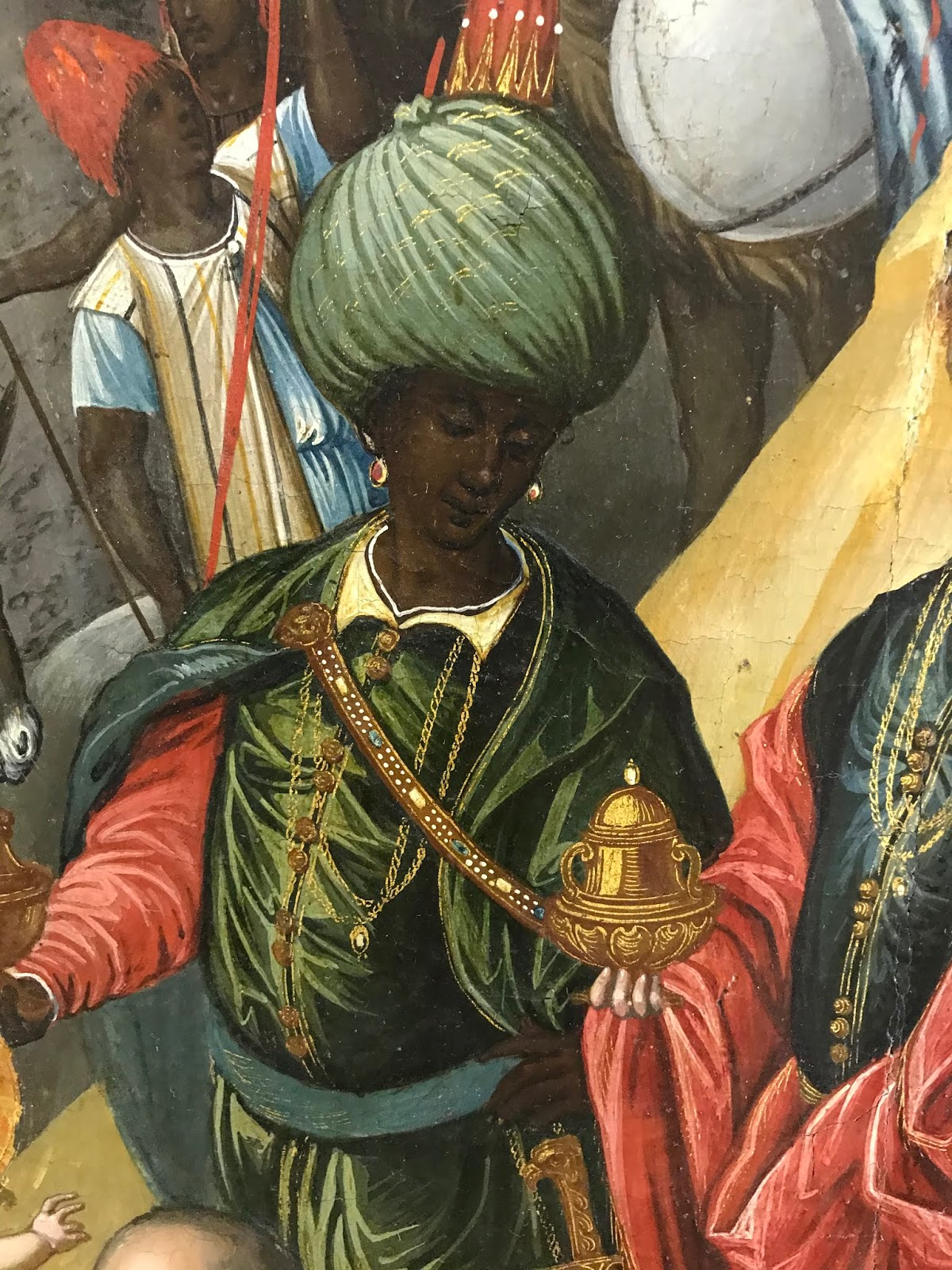
Detail of Magi

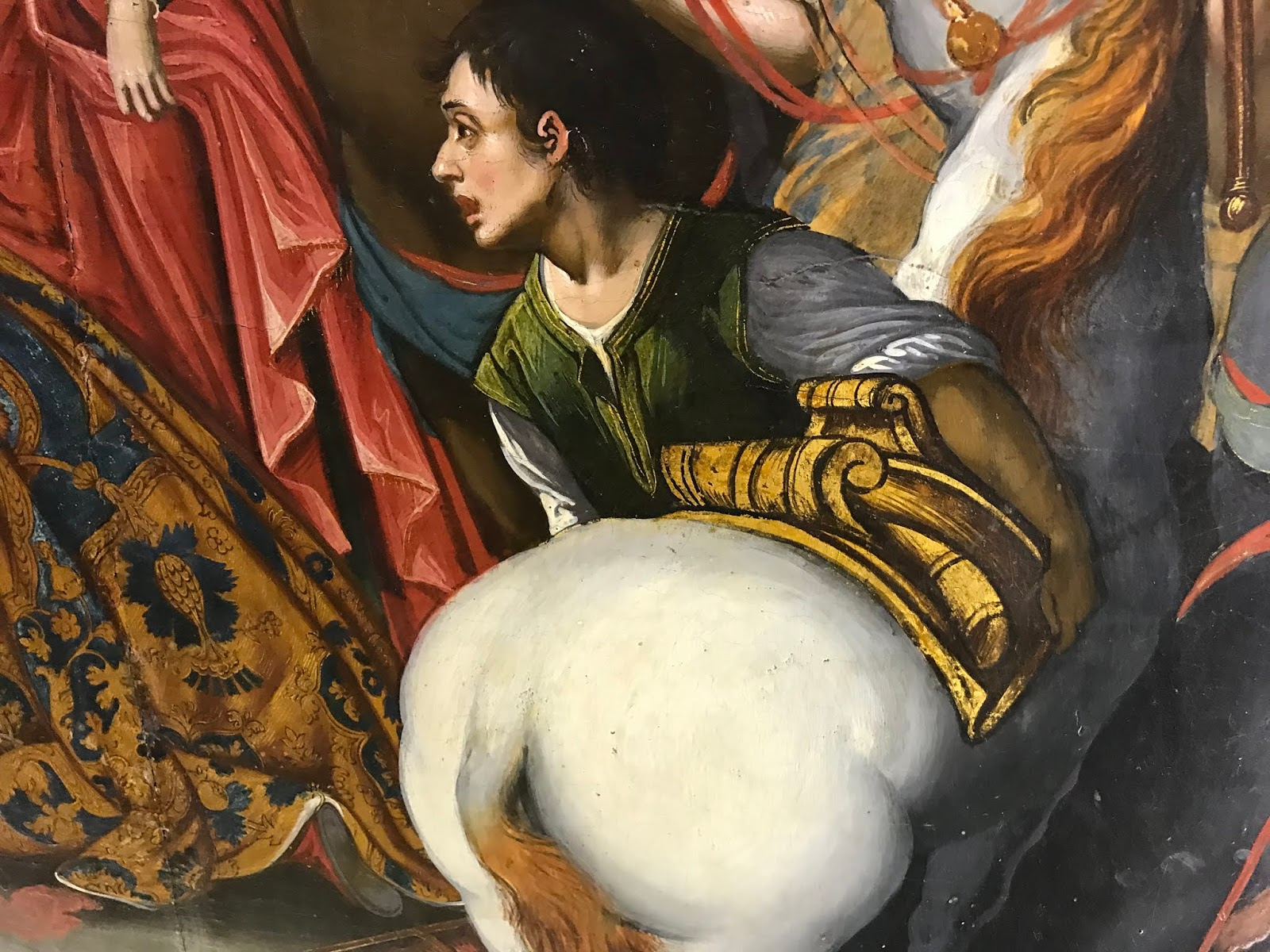
Detail of Young Man

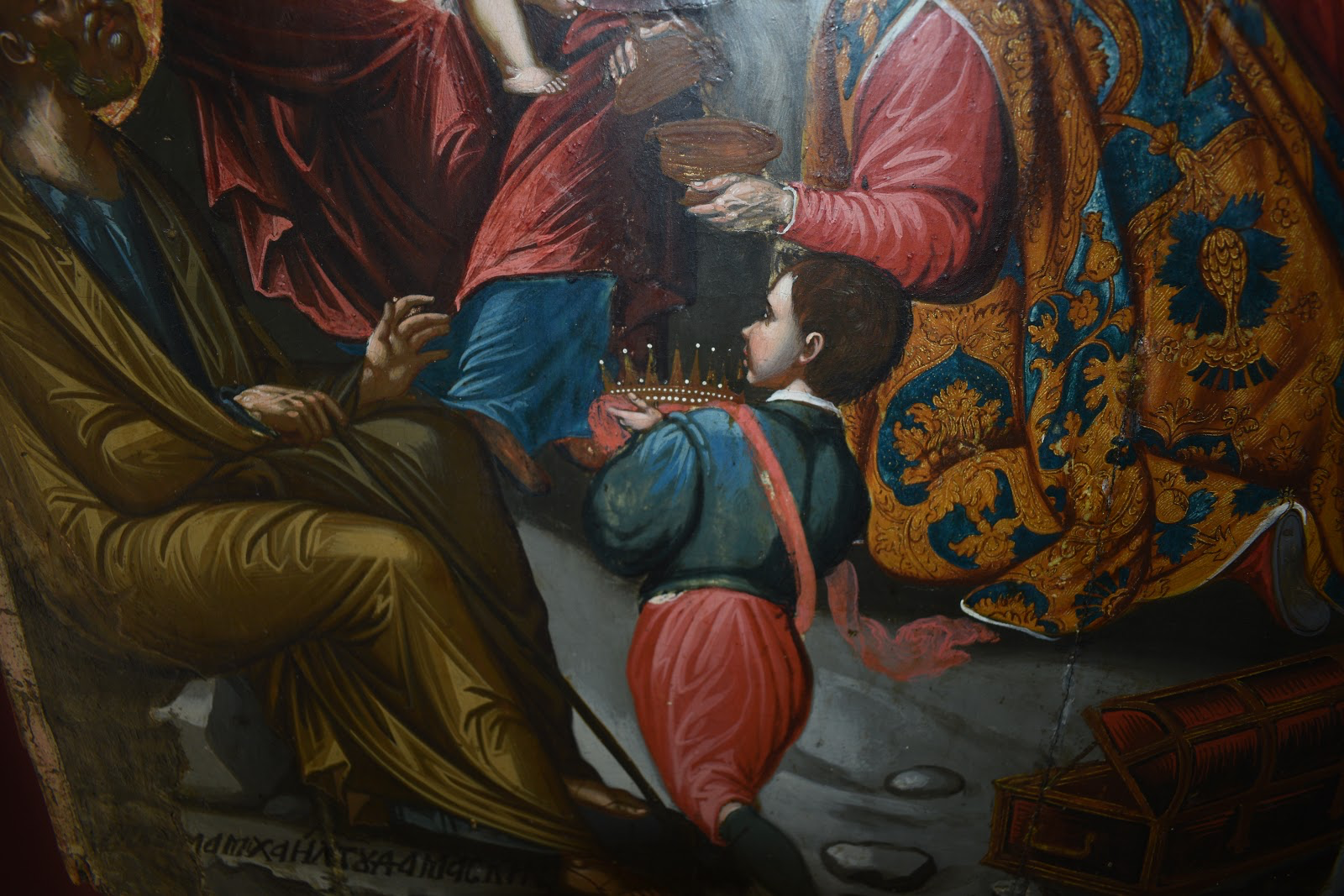
Detail of Crowning Child

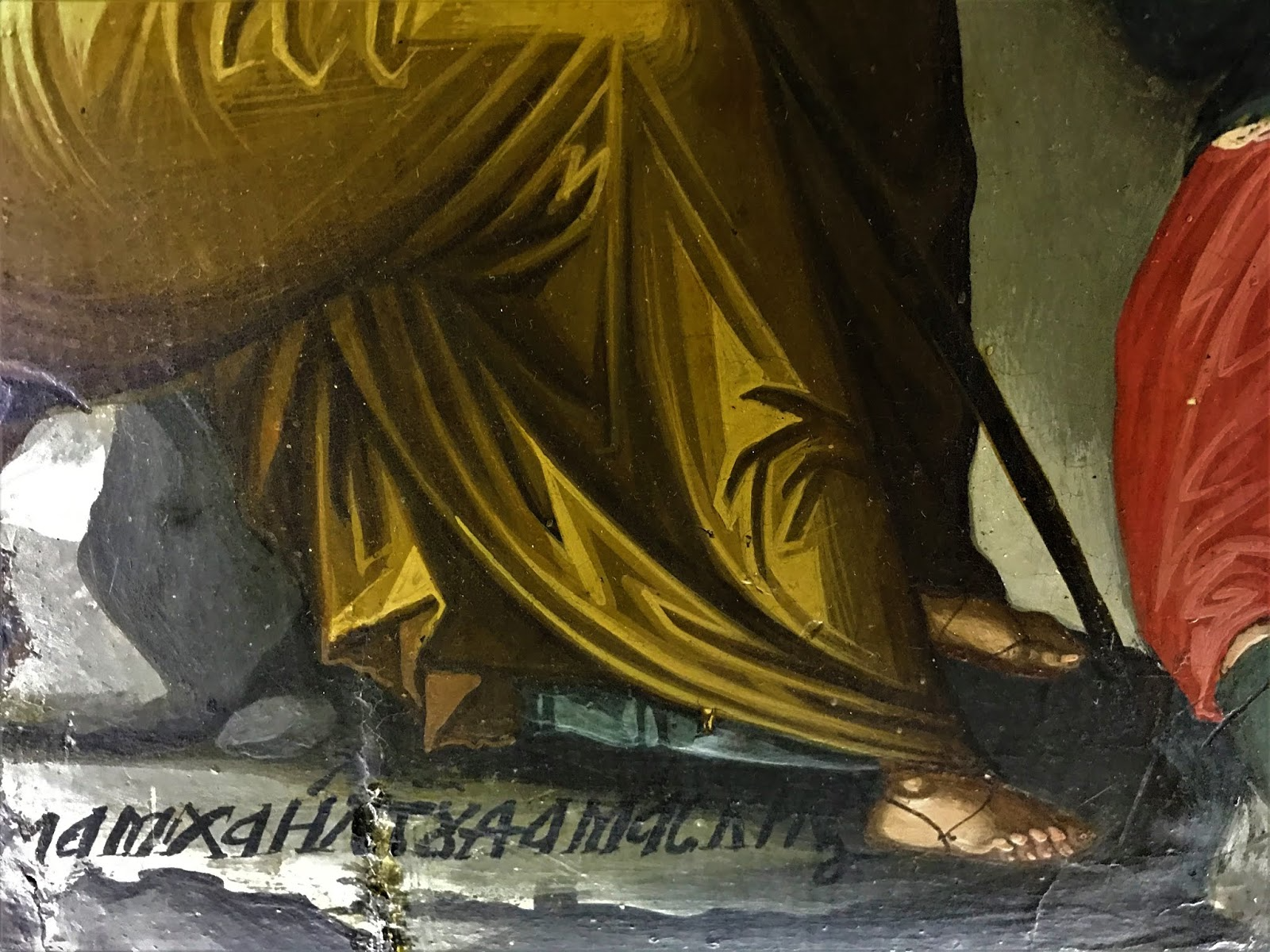
Signature

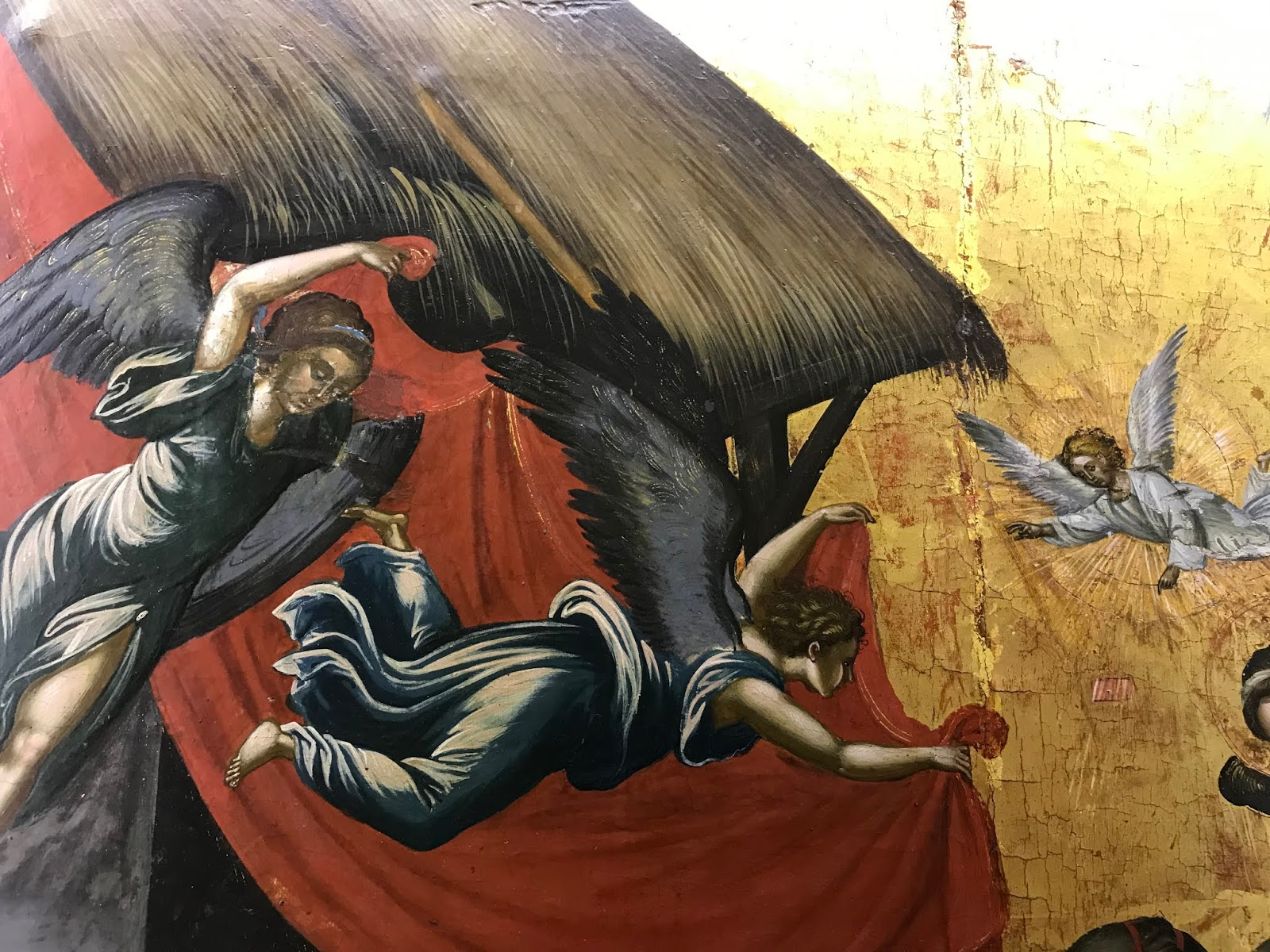
Detail of Angels

== See also ==
- Adoration of the Magi (Gentile da Fabriano)
- Jacopo Bassano
