= Canna =

Canna may refer to:

== Places ==
- Canna, Western Australia, a locality in the Shire of Morawa, Australia
- Canna, Calabria, a comune in the province of Cosenza, Italy
- Cannae, a frazione in the province of Barletta-Andria-Trani, Apulia, Italy
- Canna, Scotland, an island in the Inner Hebrides

== People ==
- Canna (name)
- Canna (gamer), (born 2000), League of Legends player
- Saint Canna, sixth-century mother of saints and nun in south Wales

== Other uses ==
- Canna (plant), a genus of flowering plants
- Canna (unit), an ancient Italian length unit, equal to 2–3 m
- Canna Creek, a tributary to Lobutcha Creek, Mississippi
- MV Canna, a car ferry built for Caledonian MacBrayne
- Cana, a Coahuiltecan tribe sometimes spelled Canna

== See also ==
- Cana (disambiguation)
- Cannae (disambiguation)
- Imatto-canna
- Kanna (disambiguation)
