= Flor de Caña (disambiguation) =

Flor de Caña ('sugarcane flower') is a brand of Nicaraguan rum.

Flor de Caña may also refer to:

- Flor de caña, a 1948 Mexican film
- Flor de Caña FC, a Nicaraguan football team
- Flor de Caña Open, a golf tournament on the PGA Tour Latinoamérica

== See also ==
- Cana (disambiguation)
