= Water into Wine (disambiguation) =

Water into Wine refers to the transformation of water into wine at the wedding at Cana.

Water into Wine may also refer to:

- "Water into Wine" (song), by Cold Chisel, 1998
- Water into Wine, a book by Tom Harpur, 2007

== See also ==
- Wedding at Cana (disambiguation)
