= Crucifixion of Saint Andrew (Damaskinos) =

Painting by Michael Damaskinos

- Σταύρωση του Αγίου Ανδρέα (Greek), Crocifissione di Sant'Andrea (Italian)
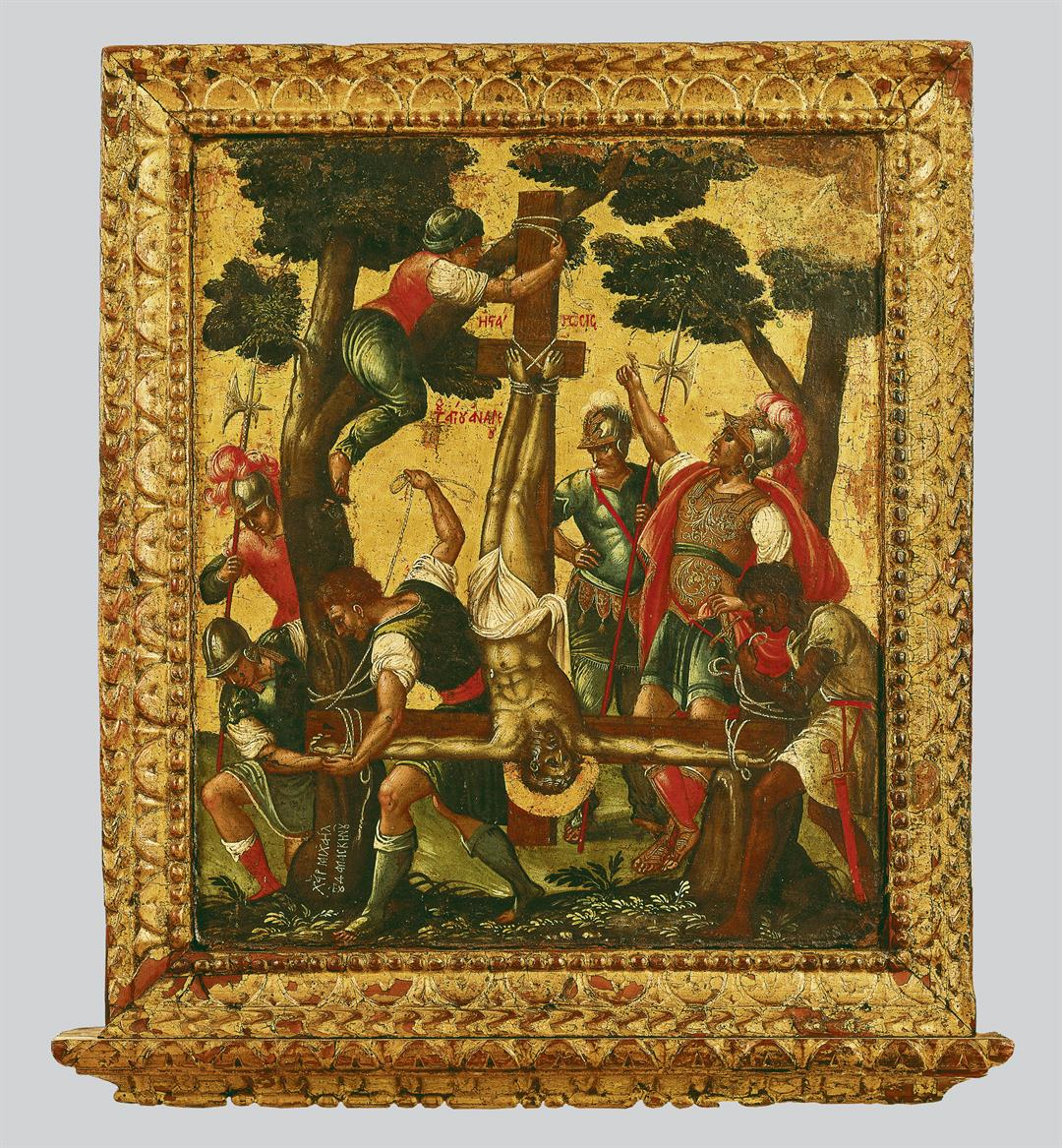
- Artist: Michael Damaskinos
- Year: 1545–1593
- Medium: Tempera on wood
- Subject: Upside down crucifixion of Saint Andrew
- Dimensions: 49 cm × 40 cm (19.3 in × 15.7 in)
- Location: Byzantine and Christian Museum, Athens, Greece
- Owner: Byzantine and Christian Museum

Crucifixion of Saint Andrew is a tempera painting by Greek painter Michael Damaskinos. Damaskinos painted in Heraklion, Venice, Sicily, and other parts of Italy. He was associated with the Greek church San Giorgio dei Greci in Venice. His painting of the Crucifixion of Saint Andrew follows the traditional Greek mannerisms prevalent at the time. It is a rare painting of Andrew the Apostle crucified in the same style as his brother Saint Peter. Saint Peter refused to be crucified the same way as Jesus. He was crucified upside down. Saint Andrew is typically crucified in the form of an X rather than the cross. He was crucified in Patras where his remains can be found today at the Cathedral of Saint Andrew, Patras. The Damaskinos painting of the Crucifixion of Saint Andrew can be found at the Byzantine and Christian Museum in Athens, Greece.

== Description ==
The work is egg tempera and gold leaf on wood with dimensions of 49 cm x 40 cm (19.3 in x 15.7 in). It was created in the middle part of the 16th century. The painting depicts Saint Andrew on an upside-down cross between two trees along the axis of the image sunk into the ground. Andrew is tied with ropes around his arms and legs. Three of the subjects tie ropes and fasten the cross to the trees. The subject on the left with the help of a soldier with a helmet ties the cross. Another figure with long leggings and a hat is perched on a branch high in the tree tying the top of the cross. He is instructed by a high-ranking soldier dressed in military attire. Two of the soldiers have spheres reminiscent of the Roman weapons used at the historic event in Patras. The person to our right is another soldier with a short tunic and a sword hung from his waist. Around the trees, there are small ornamental plants in the ground. The tree on our left bears the painter's signature.

== See also ==
- The Crucifixion of Saint Andrew (Caravaggio)
