= Wedding at Cana (disambiguation) =

The Wedding at Cana is a story in the Bible.

Wedding at Cana, or similar, may also refer to:

- The Marriage Feast at Cana (Bosch), a painting by or after Hieronymus Bosch, after 1550
- Wedding at Cana (Damaskinos), a painting by Michael Damaskinos, c. 1560–1570
- The Marriage at Cana (Gerard David), a painting by Gerard David, c. 1500–1510
- The Wedding at Cana (Veronese), a painting by Paolo Veronese, 1563

== See also ==
- Water into Wine (disambiguation)
