= Wedding at Cana (Damaskinos) =

Painting by Michael Damaskinos

- Ο Γάμος της Κανά (Greek), Le Nozze di Cana (Italian)
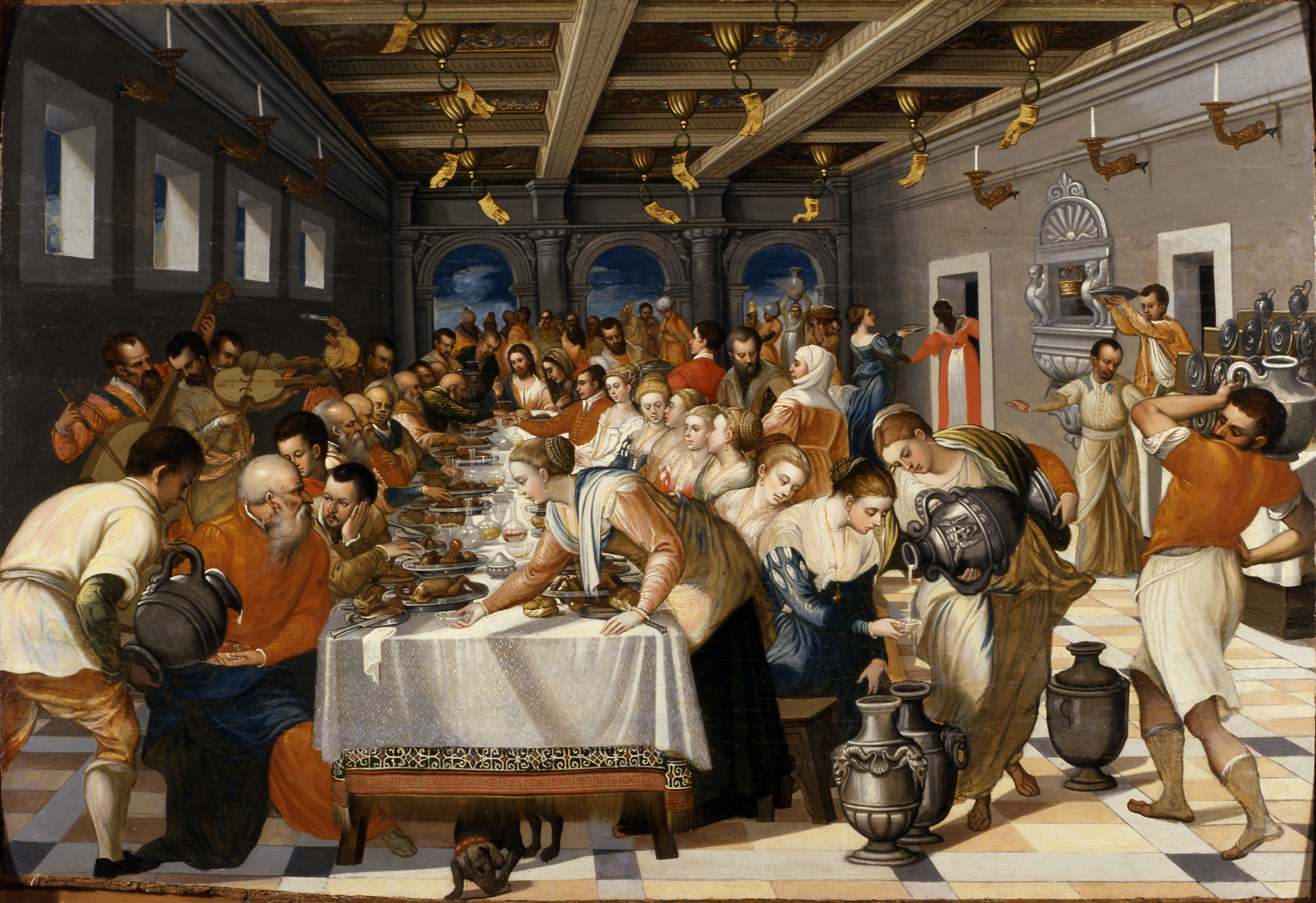
- Artist: Michael Damaskinos
- Year: c. 1560–1583
- Medium: oil on canvas on panel
- Subject: Wedding Feast at Cana
- Dimensions: 85 cm × 118 cm (33.5 in × 46.5 in)
- Location: Museo Correr; Venice
- Website: Official Website

Wedding at Cana also known as Wedding Feast at Cana and Le Nozze di Cana is an oil painting by Michael Damaskinos. He was active during the second half of the 16th century in Heraklion, Sicily, Venice, and different parts of Italy. Over 100 works are attributed to the artist. Most of his work resembled the Greek mannerisms prevalent at the time also known as maniera greca. He was clearly influenced by Venetian painting. His version of the Wedding at Cana was a copy of Tintoretto's massive painting of the Wedding Feast at Cana. The monumental canvas was 4.4 m x 5.9 m or 14.4 ft x 19.3 ft. The painting was originally in the dining hall (refectory) of the convent of the Crociferi in Venice. Refectories typically featured large paintings of biblical banquet scenes. The monks preferred biblical banquet scenes because they desired the impression of dining with Christ. Damaskinos probably saw the painting at the convent or a copy of the masterpiece in Venice. The Damaskinos version is much smaller than the original. The painting is very important because it is one of the few instances where Damaskinos broke from the traditional maniera greca prevalent in most of his works. In this instance, he strictly followed the lines of Venetian painting exhibiting his superior craftsmanship as a painter capable of changing his style. El Greco was another painter who also painted in both styles. The Damaskinos version is currently at the Museo Correr in Venice, Italy.

== Subject ==
The Wedding at Cana is a popular theme painted by many artists. Italian Renaissance painter Paolo Veronese who was based in Venice painted his version of The Wedding at Cana. The theme is traditionally considered the first miracle attributed to Jesus in the Gospel of John. Jesus Christ, his mother, and his disciples were invited to a wedding. His mother noticed the wine was running out. Jesus delivered a sign of his divinity by turning the water into wine. The location of Cana was in some village in Galilee. The painting by Michael Damaskinos is a visual interpretation of the event.

== Description ==
The work is an oil on canvas on panel painting with dimensions 85 cm × 118 cm (33.5 in × 46.5 in) Tintoretto's massive painting is eleven times larger than the Damaskinos. The painting was completed between 1560 and 1583. The massive wedding banquet poses many similarities to Tintoretto's work but features many differences. Compared to the Tintoretto the Damaskinos version lacks a massive chandelier in the center of the room. The time of day is also different. Night occupies the atmosphere. A band plays to the left of the massive banquet table. The floor is tiled. The guest of honor stands out, he is dressed in lavish attire. The painting is a historical archive of 16th century Venice. The instruments and lavish opulent clothing allow viewers the impression of the fashion trends of that era.

Jesus and the Virgin Mary are at the end of the table. He is blessing the water and turning it into wine. In the window frame to our right two-winged Lion's of Venice decorate the window opening. The winged lion symbolizes the city of Venice. In the rear of the room garnishing the wall in Tintoretto's version are elaborately decorated Ionic Columns reminiscent of ancient Greek architecture. In the Damaskinos version, more simple Doric columns are implemented. The major symbol of ancient Greek art in Damaskinos's works was the consistent use of ancient Greek Cretan meander patterns. The symbols decorate the table cloth. A similar design was on the table cloth in Damaskinos's Last Supper. The dog in both The Last Supper and the Wedding at Cana was borrowed from Tintoretto's version of the Wedding at Cana. The assortment of food, silverware, and wine jugs is common to Damaskinos's Last Supper and the current Wedding at Cana. Some historians attributed another version of the Wedding at Cana to Damaskinos. The item recently sold for 136,000 dollars.

== Gallery ==
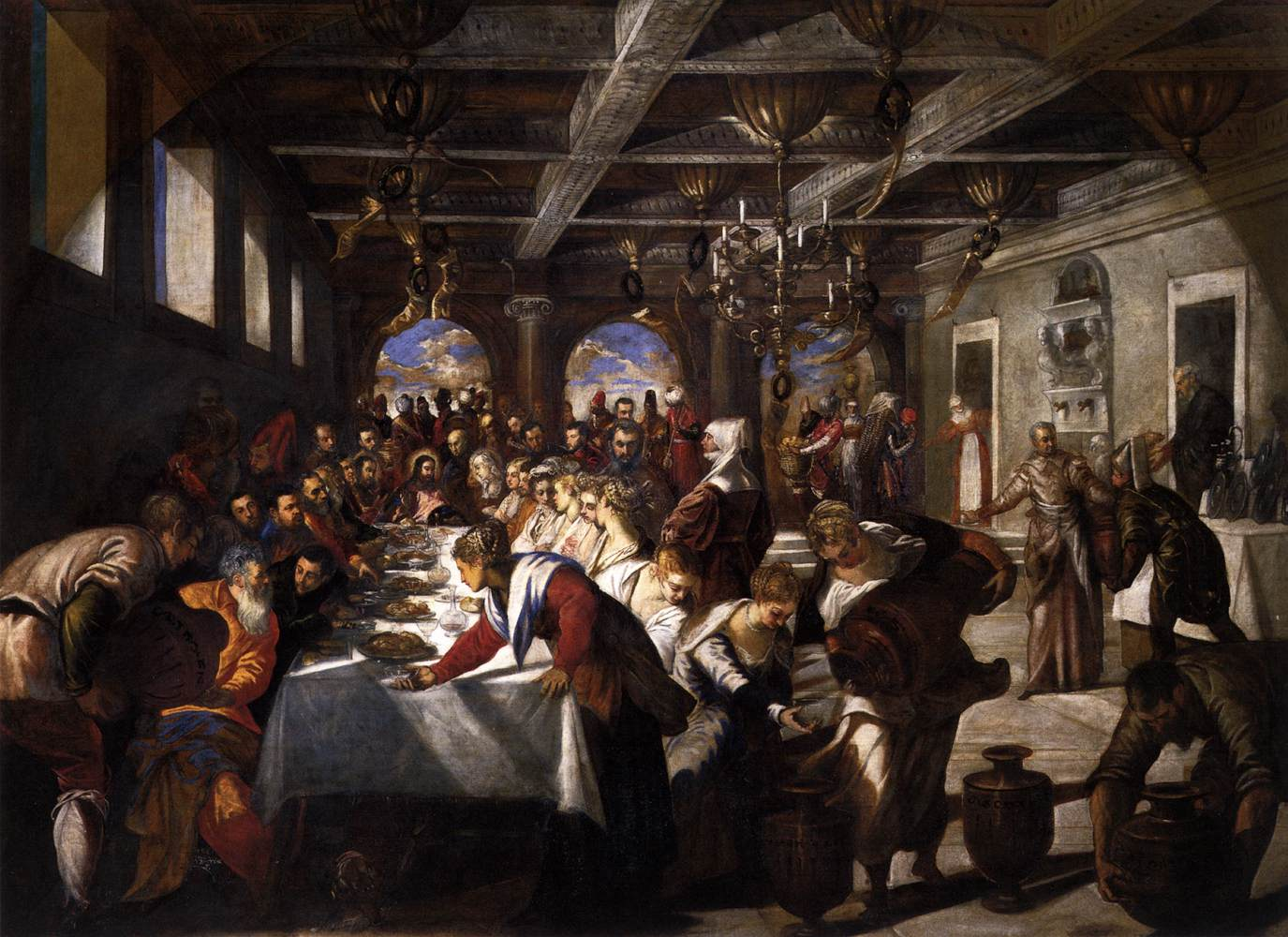
Tintoretto's Wedding at Cana

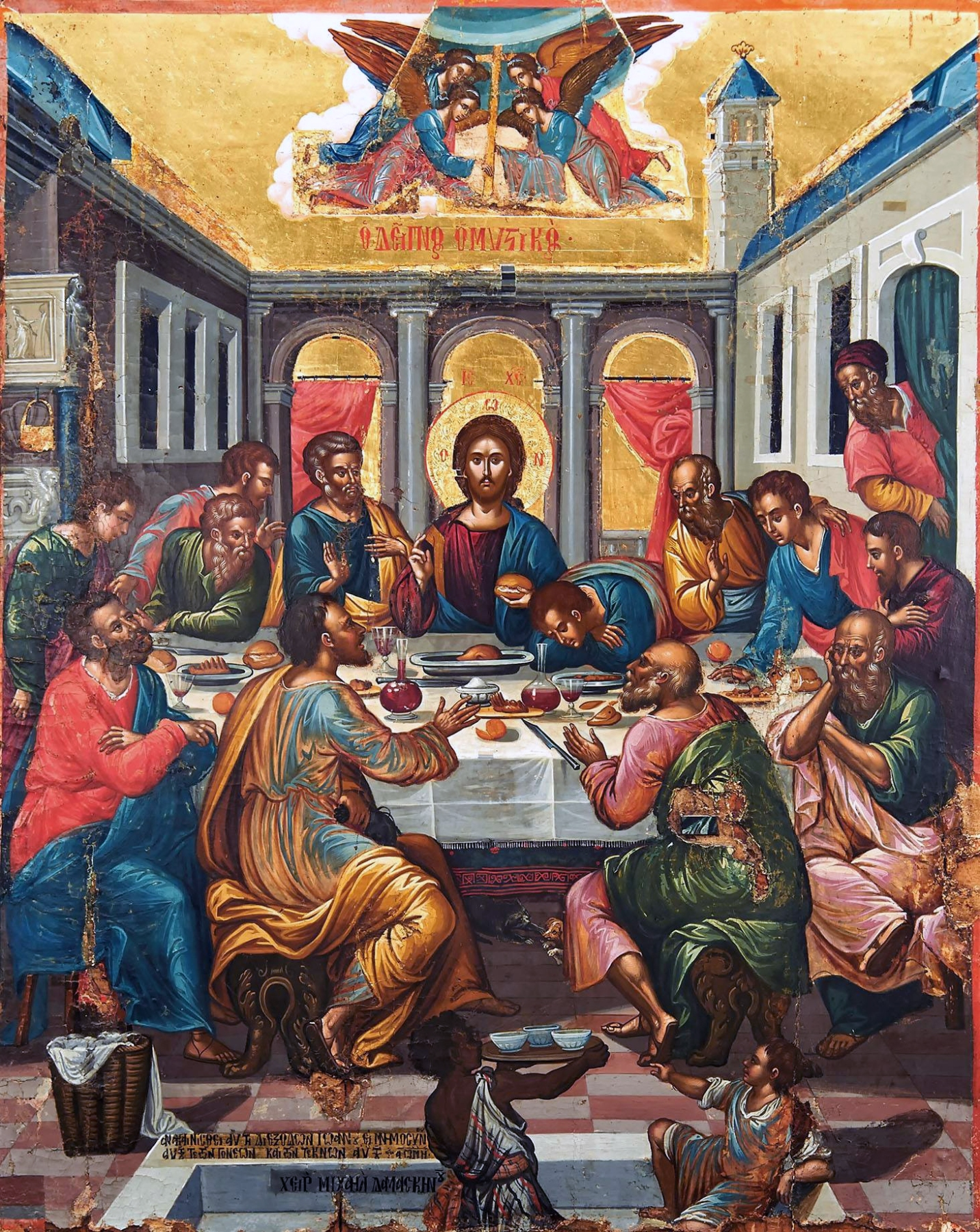
The Last Supper

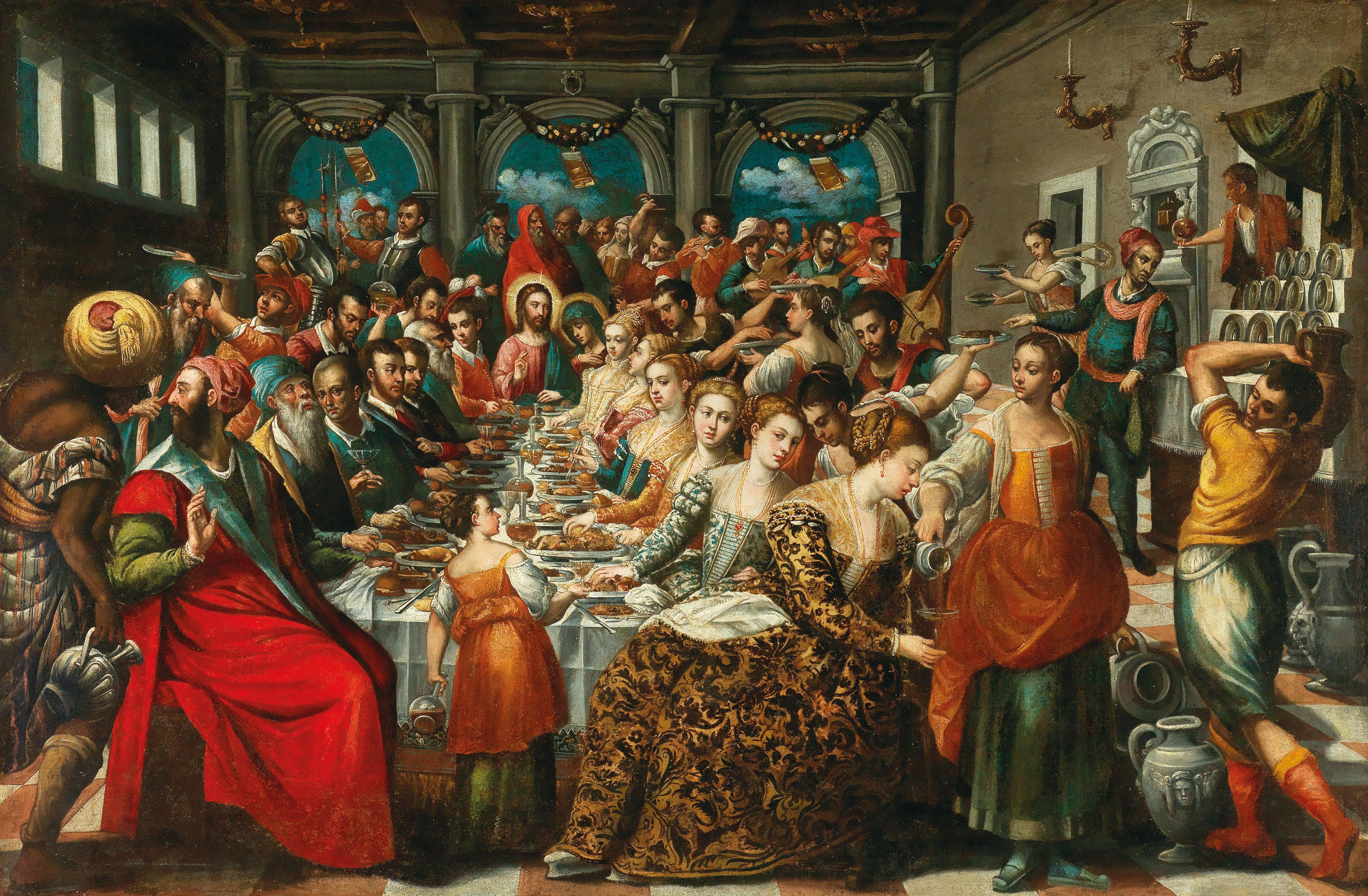
Second Wedding Feast at Cana Attributed to Damaskinos
