= Greek painting =

Greek painting may refer to:

- Greek art
  - Greek Bronze Age art
  - Greek Neolithic art
  - Ancient Greek art
    - Ancient Greek vase painting
    - East Greek vase painting
    - Hellenistic art
  - Modern Greek art
  - Culture of Greece#Painting

== See also ==
- Pottery of ancient Greece
