= Canna (name) =

Canna is a first name and surname. Notable people with the name include:

- Saint Canna, 6th-century Welsh saint and Breton princess
- Achille Canna (born 1932), Italian basketball player
- Carlo Canna (born 1992), Italian rugby union player
- Nobutoshi Canna (born 1968), Japanese voice actor
