= Michael Damaskinos =

Greek painter

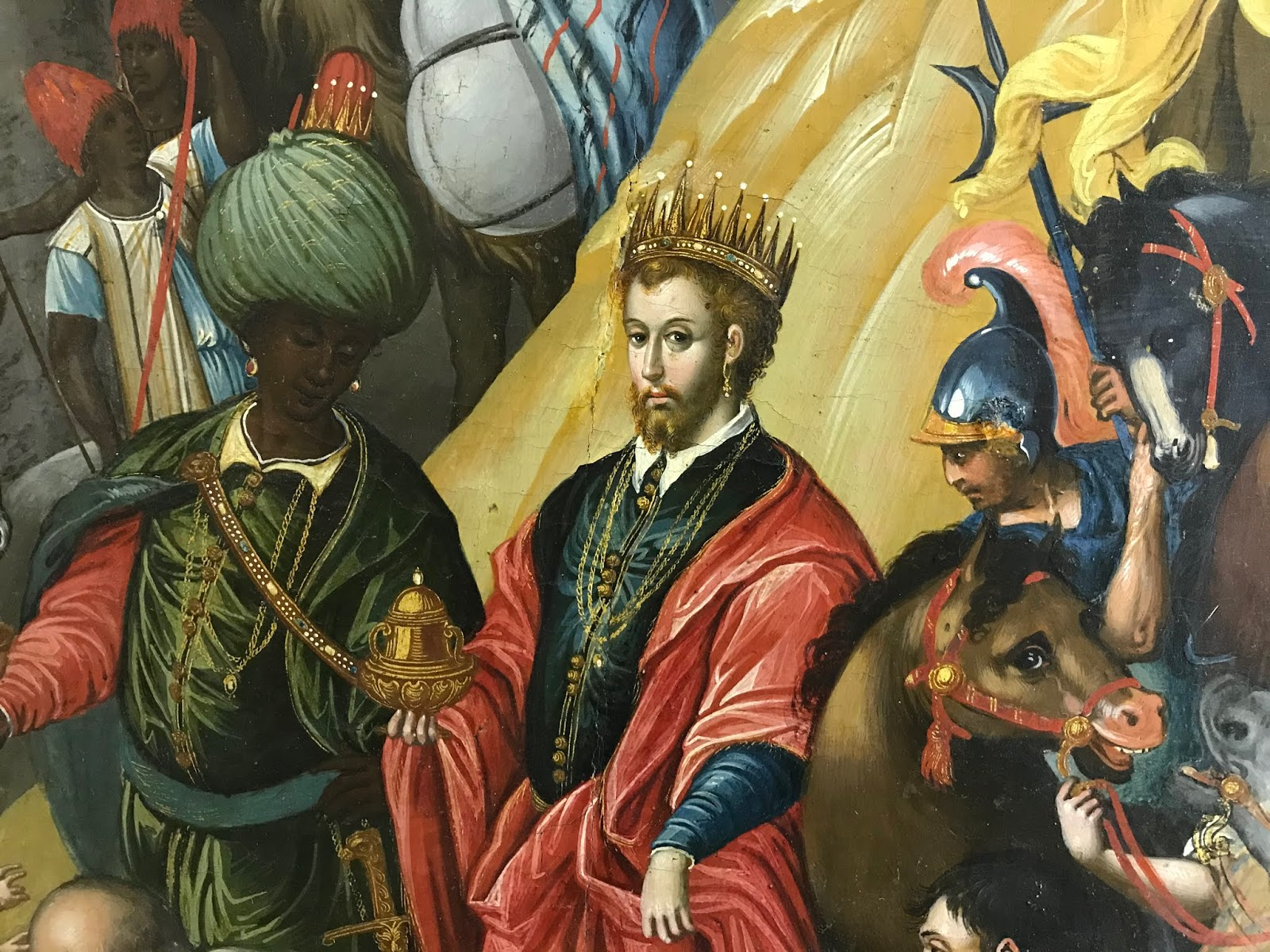
- Michael Damaskinos
- Born: 1530/35; Crete
- Died: 1592/93; Crete
- Movement: Cretan School
- Patrons: San Giorgio dei Greci
- Years active: 1550-1593
- Era: Italian Renaissance
- Style: Maniera Greca

Michael Damaskenos or Michail Damaskenos (also Damaskinos) (Greek: Μιχαήλ Δαμασκηνός, 1530/35–1592/93) was a leading post-Byzantine Cretan painter. He is a major representative of the Cretan School of painting that flourished in the 16th and 17th centuries. Painters Georgios Klontzas and Damaskenos were major contributors to the Cretan School during the same period. Damaskinos traveled all over the Venetian Empire painting. He remained loyal to his Greek roots stylistically but incorporated some Italian elements in his work. He was strongly influenced by the Venetian school. He painted parts of the Cathedral of San Giorgio dei Greci. Damaskenos has 100 known works. He influenced the works of Theodore Poulakis.

== Life and work ==
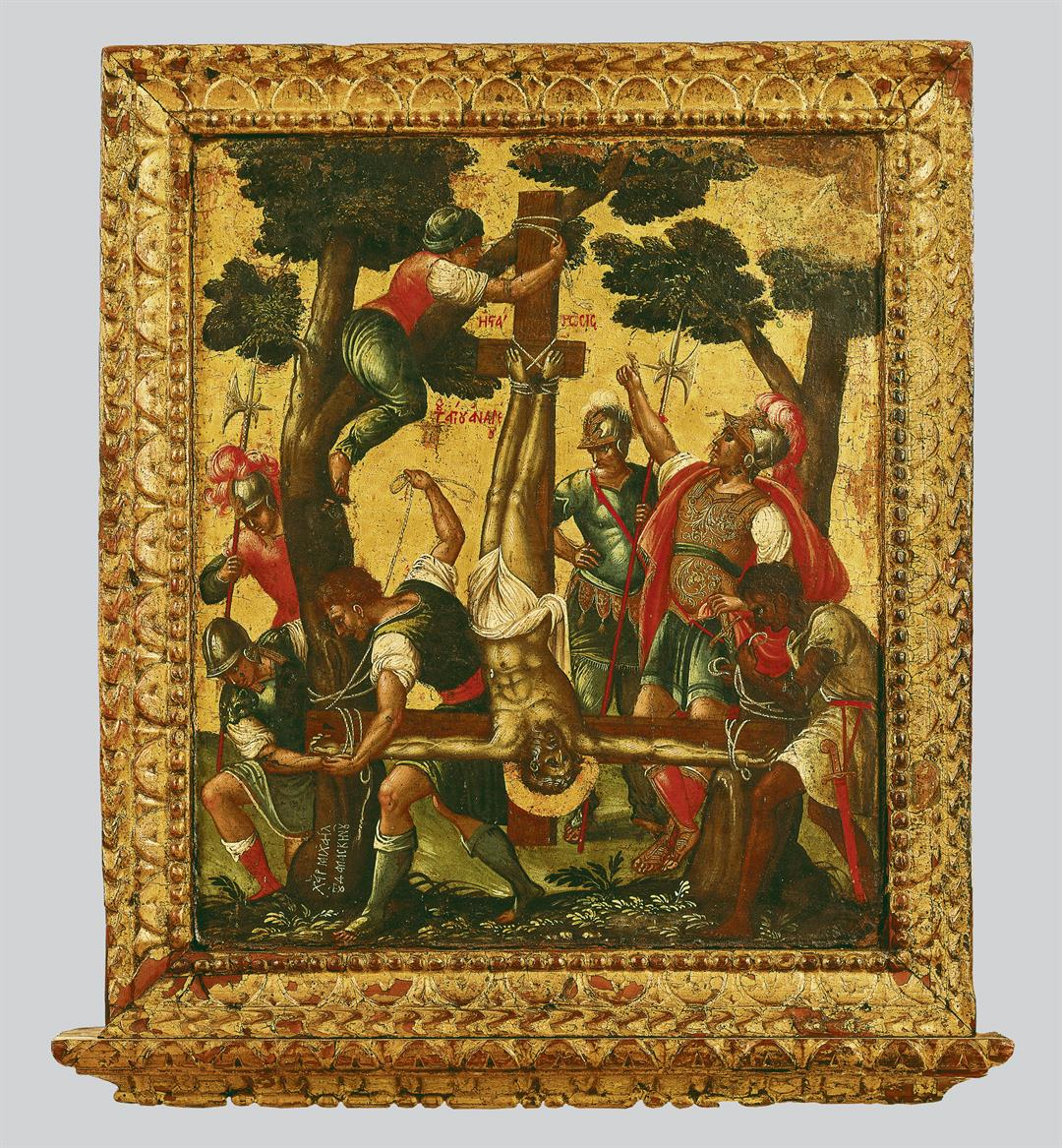
The Crucifixion of St Andrew, late 1500s

Damaskinos was born in Candia (Herakleion), his father was George Damaskinos. According to legend, Damaskinos spent some time living and working in Vrontisi Monastery, where six of his icons were kept until 1800. Damaskinos moved to Venice in the 1560s; while he was there he learned miniature painting.

He traveled extensively throughout Italy. From contracts we know he briefly stayed in Sicily from 1569 to 1571. Afterward, he traveled back to Venice. He was a member of the Greek Brotherhood of Venice from 1577 to 1582. He painted icons for the Greek Orthodox Cathedral of San Giorgio dei Greci in Venice. He tried to become a member of the council of the confraternity, but was unsuccessful. During the same period, he worked for both Catholic institutions and executed private commissions.

He became friends with sculptor Alessandro Vittoria, and sold a collection of drawings to him which he amassed from other Italian artists (namely the Mannerist Parmigianino). He was also familiar with Palma Giovane and may have had some contact with the workshop of Tintoretto. Some of his works are clearly influenced by Paolo Veronese, Tintoretto, and Titian, which was not unusual: many Greek painters were influenced by the Venetian school. He returned to Candia around 1583.

His only daughter Antonia married painter Ioannis Mavrikas-Mandouphos (or Yannas Mantoufos). Damaskinos stayed in Greece and worked mainly in Crete and the Ionian Islands. He was invited to return to Venice by the Greek Orthodox Confraternity, who wanted to commission him to paint the dome of San Giorgio dei Greci. He declined the invitations for personal reasons. Extensive work was later completed at the church San Giorgio dei Greci by another famous painter, Emmanuel Tzane-Bounialis, who was himself influenced by Damaskinos.

Damaskinos's works were characteristic of the traditional Byzantine style. His own paintings are characterized by the use of a particular rose color; further, his figures' dimensions were defined by only a few brush strokes. He drew on wood, but never the marble thrones which were typical in the Cretan School. Damaskinos was also the first artist to introduce paler flesh tones to post-Byzantine painting, one of the stylistic features of his work which proved highly influential from the second half of the sixteenth century and onwards.

Damaskinos signed his works: ΧΕΙΡ ΜΙΧΑΗΛ ΤΟΥ ΔΑΜΑΣΚΗΝΟΥ or ΧΕΙΡ ΜΙΧΑΗΛ ΔΑΜΑΣΚΗΝΟΥ, ΔΑΜΑΣΚΗΝΟΥ ΜΙΧΑΗΛ ΧΕΙΡ or even ΠΟΙΗΜΑ ΜΙΧΑΗΛ ΤΟΥ ΔΑΜΑΣΚΗΝΟΥ (creation of Michael Damaskinos). Damaskinos worked extensively on the Ionian Islands. He contributed to the fusion of the Cretan and the Heptanese School of painting. He influenced the works of Theodore Poulakis. The famous Greek Painter and theorist Panagiotis Doxaras, in his book The Art of Painting (published in 1720), considered Damaskinos to be one of the most important painters.

== San Giorgio dei Greci ==
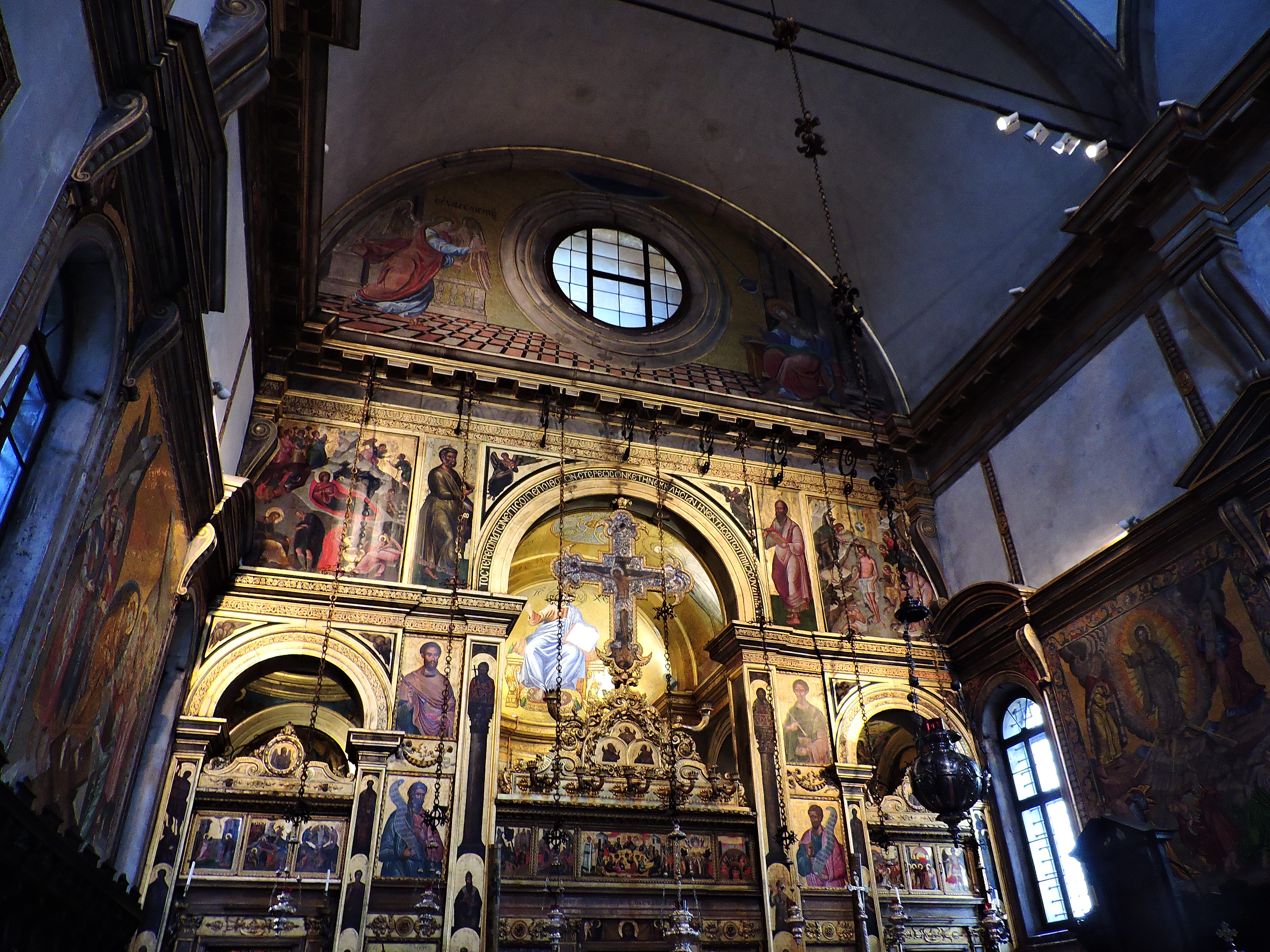
Iconostasis of San Giorgio dei Greci

Twenty-five of his major paintings are located in Venice. Damaskinos completed works for the church San Giorgio dei Greci between 1560 and 1583. Twenty of his works are part of the church San Giorgio dei Greci. Eighteen of his paintings are part of the iconostasis. The Archangel Michael is portrayed in one of the icons. The dodekaorto also known as the Great feasts in the Eastern Orthodox Church is featured in nine of the paintings. Two of his paintings are behind the iconostasis within the holy sanctuary. The Hellenic Institute of Venice has four of his paintings. The research facility and museum are associated with San Giorgio dei Greci. One of his paintings Wedding at Cana is part of the collection at the Museo Correr in Venice.

== Gallery ==
=== Traditional ===
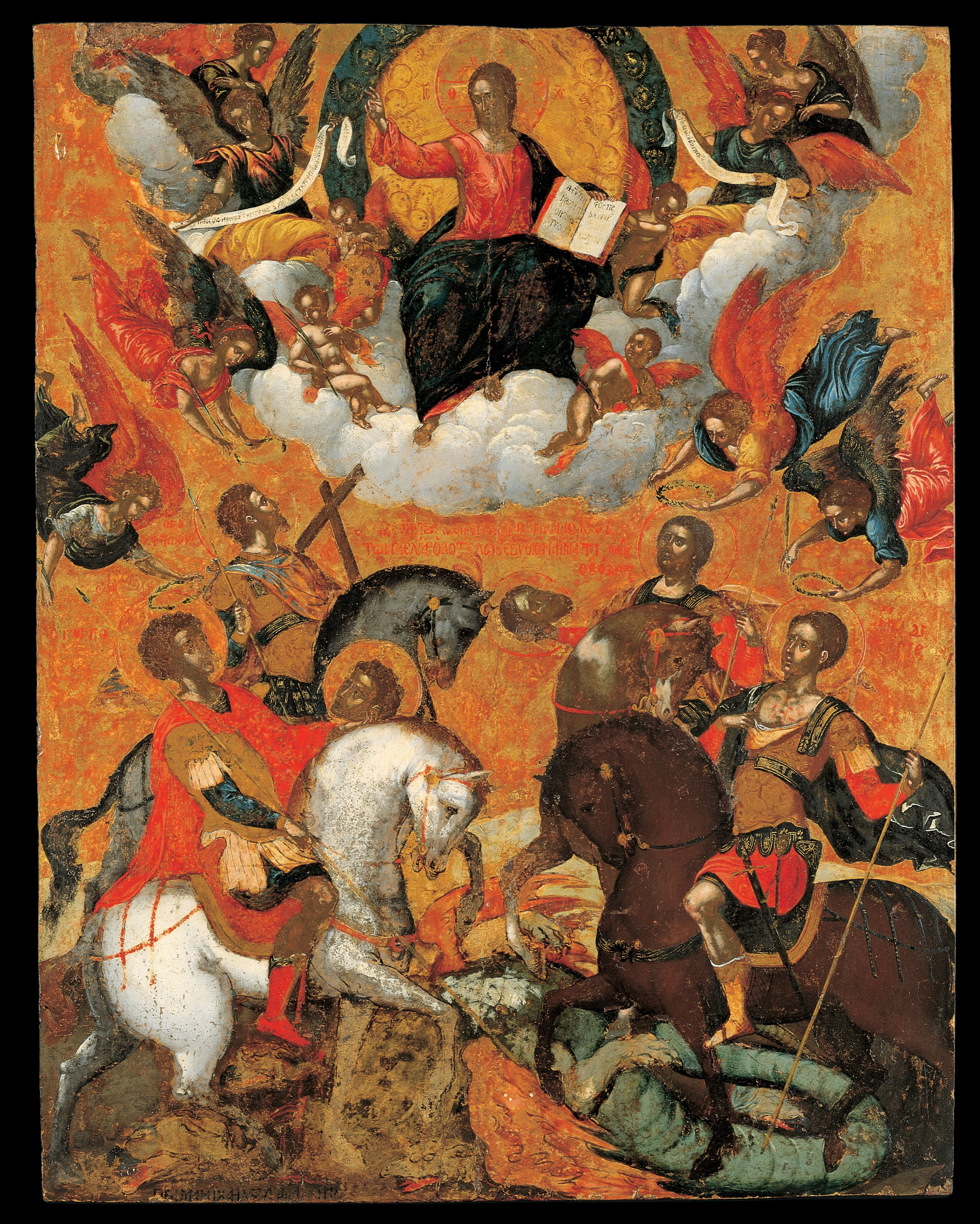
Four military saints

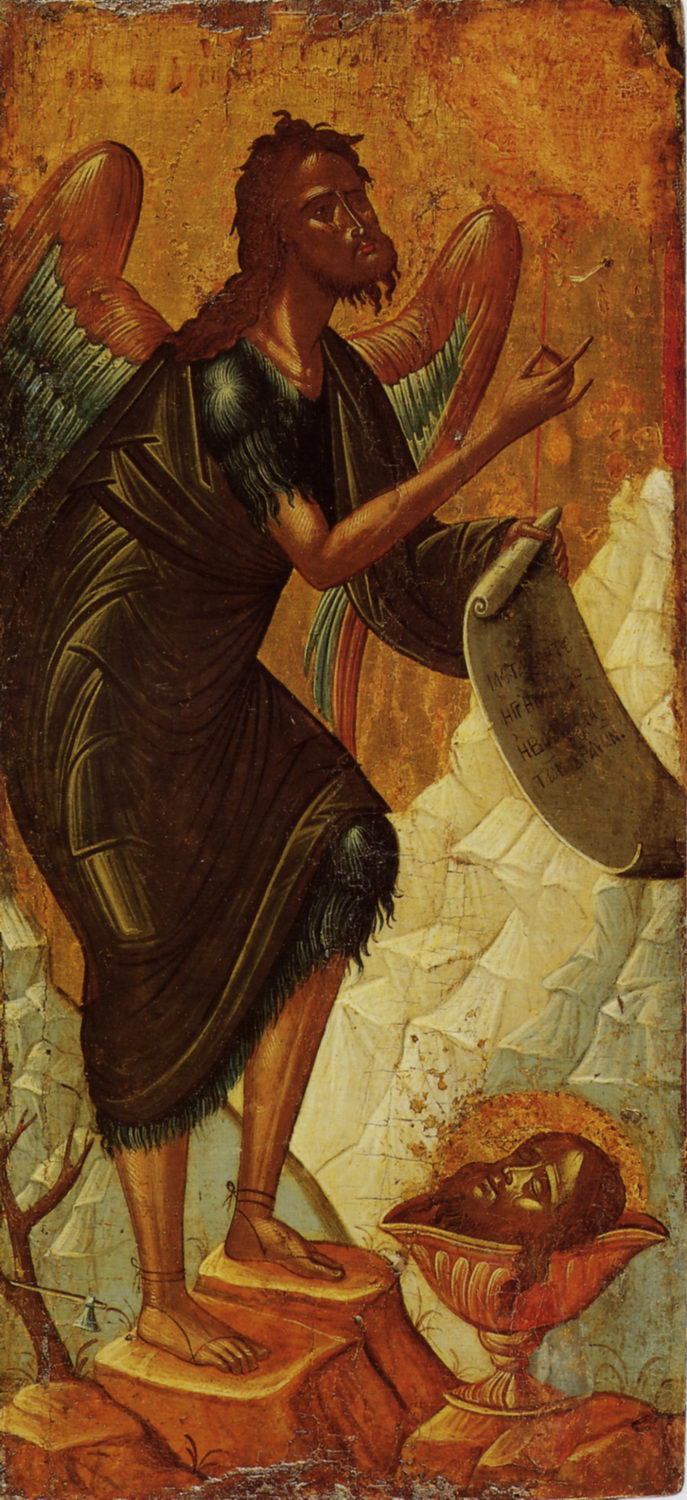
John the Angel of Desert

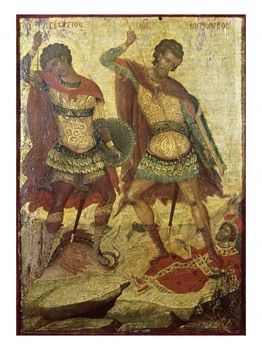
Saint George and Saint Demetrius

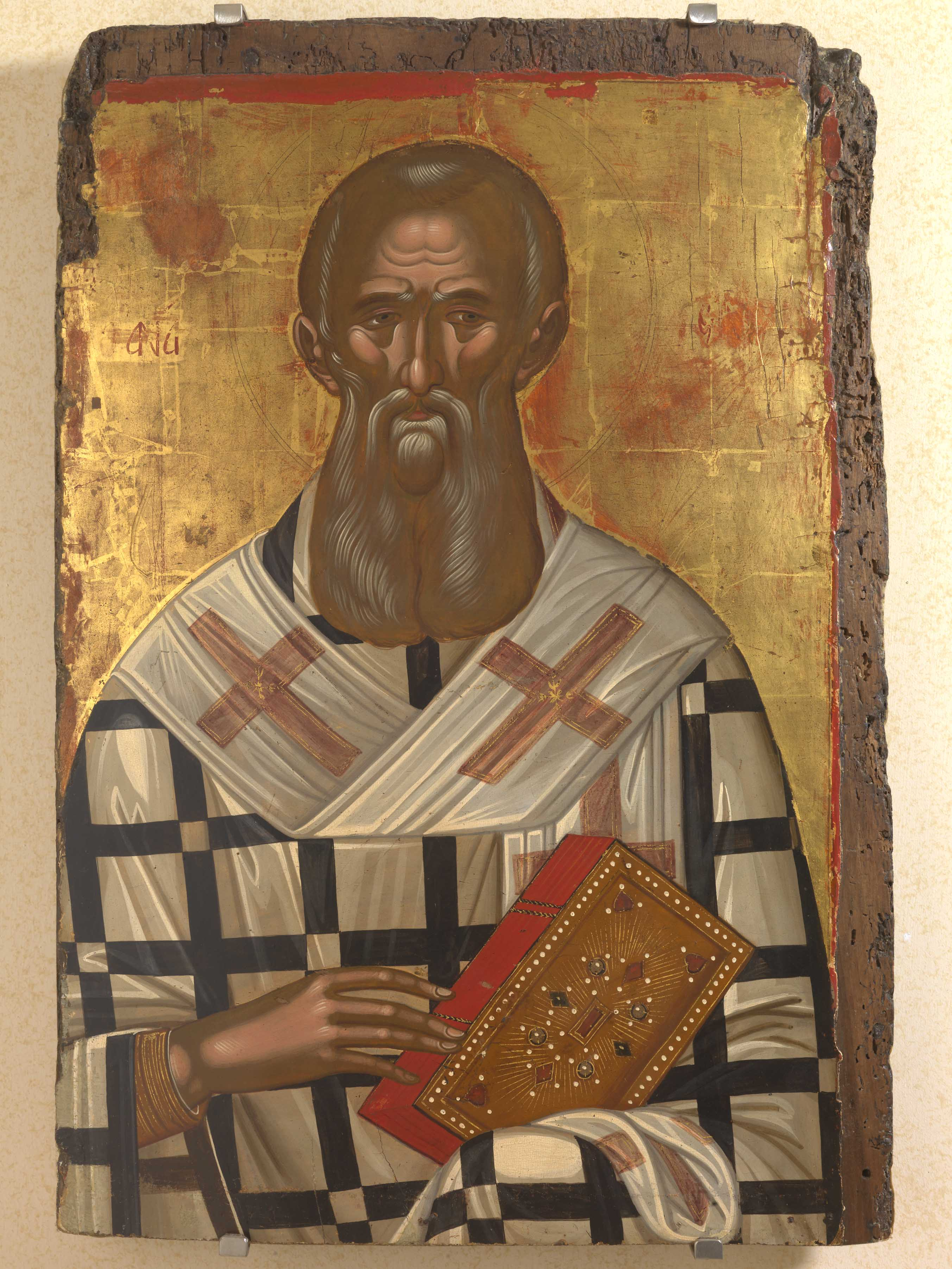
Saint Athanasius

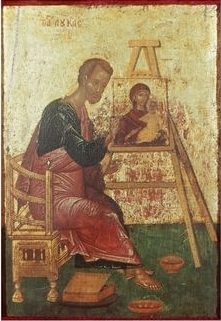
Saint Luke and the Virgin Mary

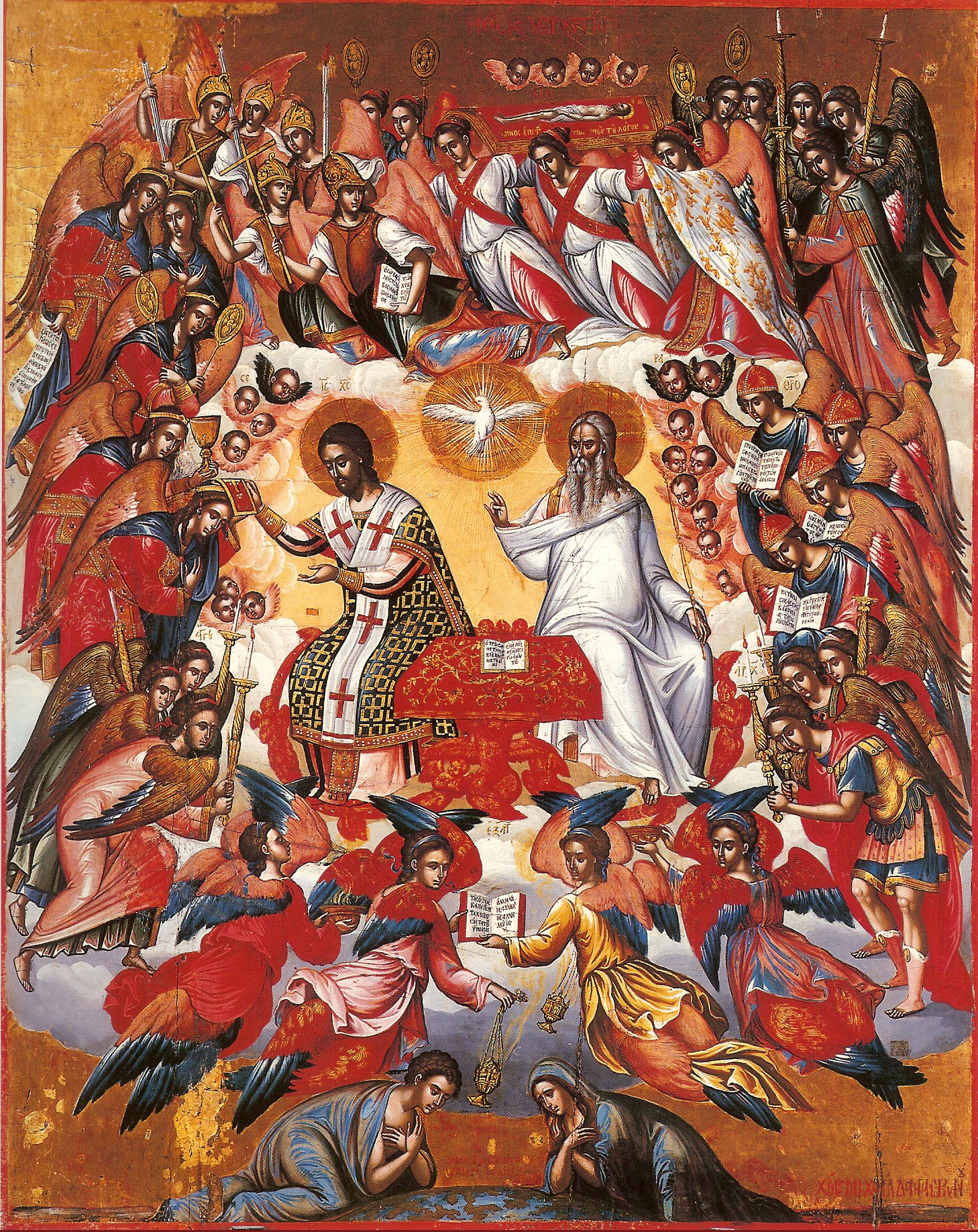
Divine Liturgy

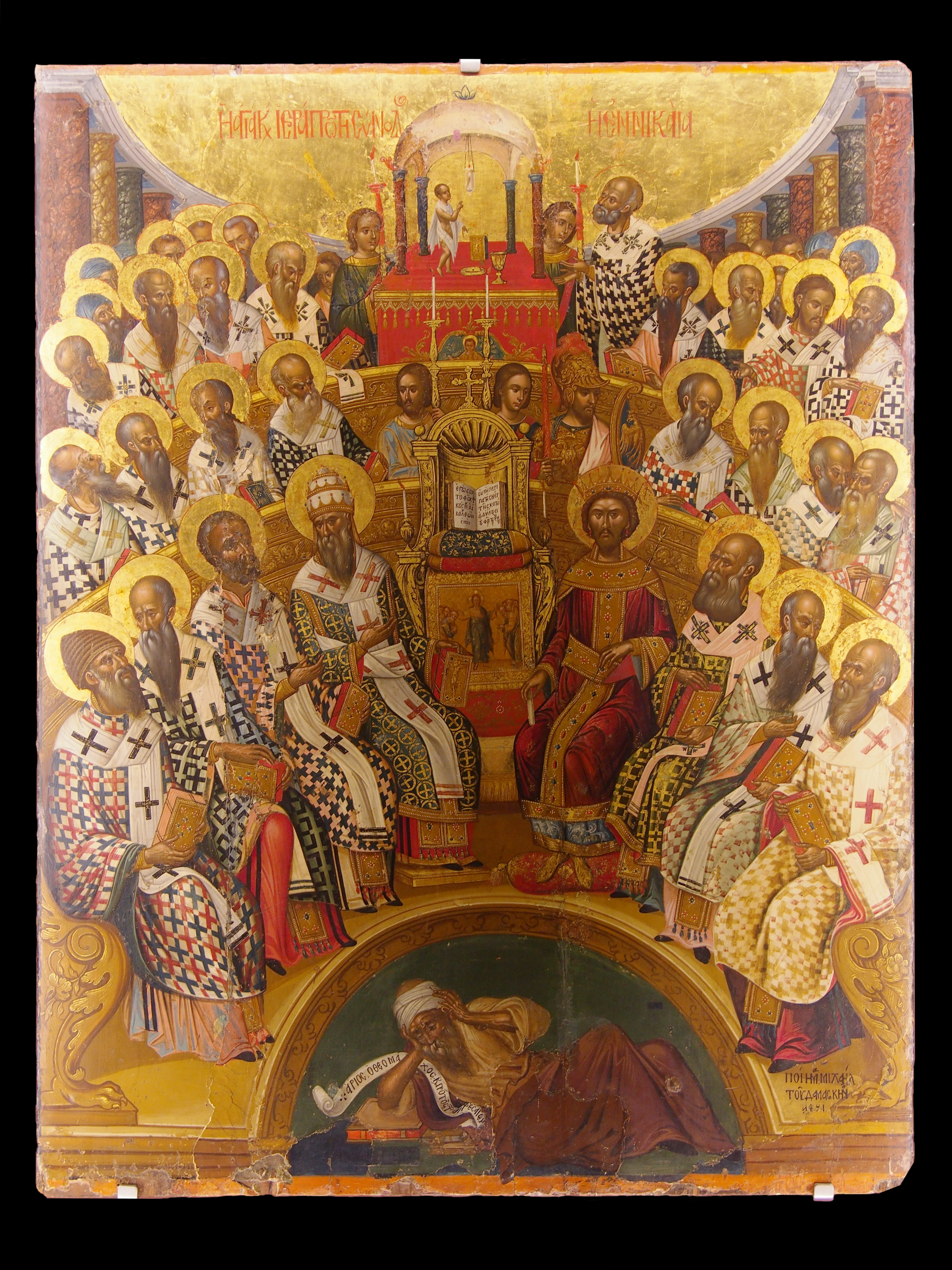
The First Council of Nicaea

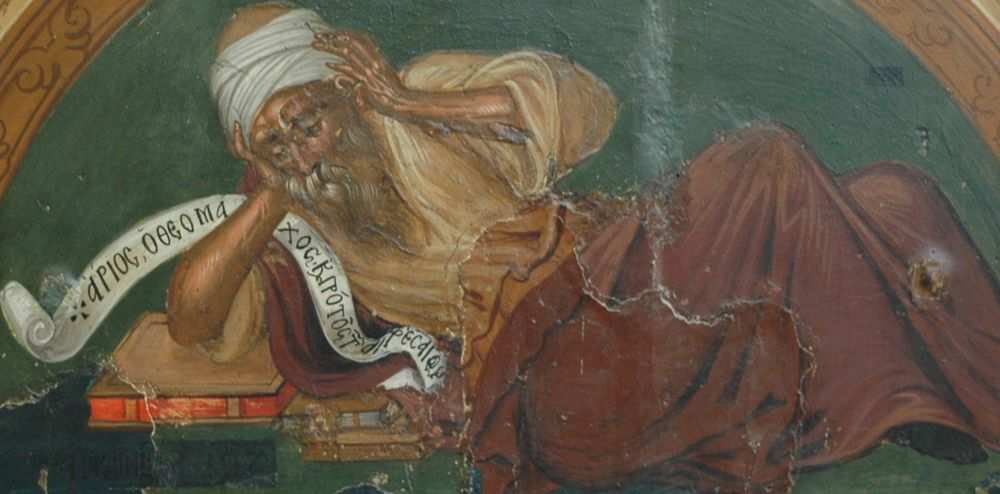
Arius - detail of Byzantine icon depicting the First Council of Nicaea

=== Venetian Cretan School ===
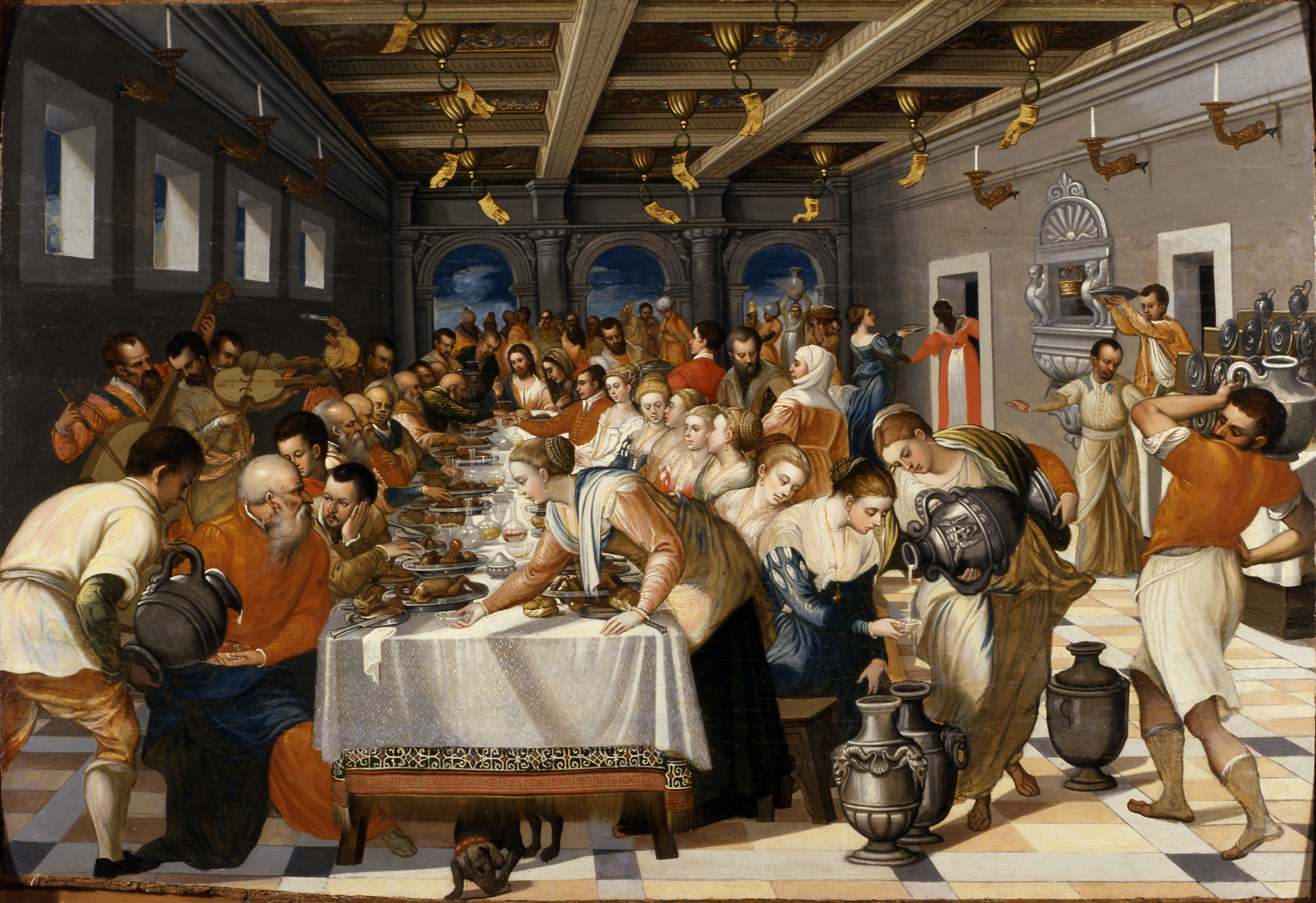
The Wedding at Cana

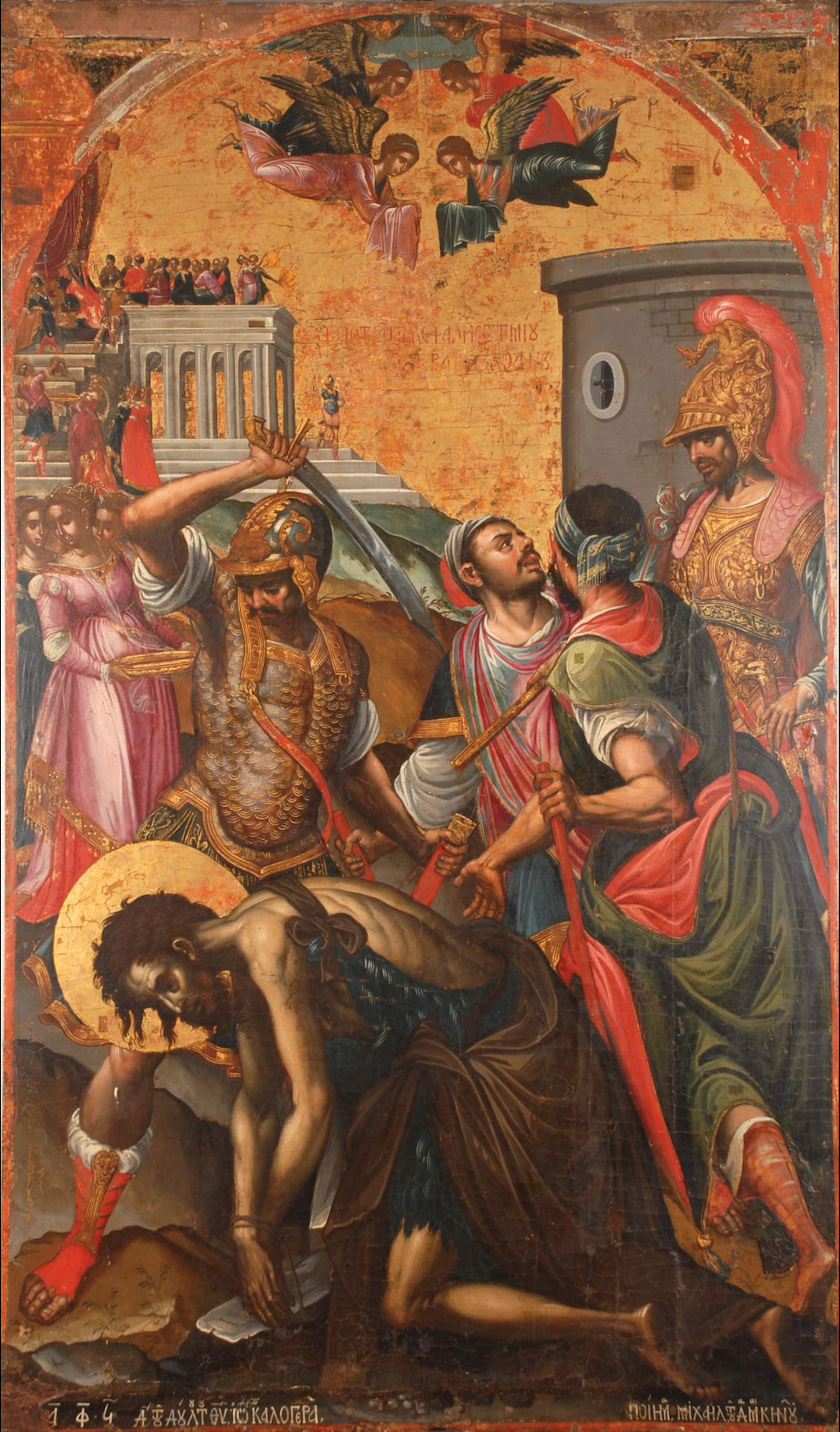
The Beheading of St John the Baptist

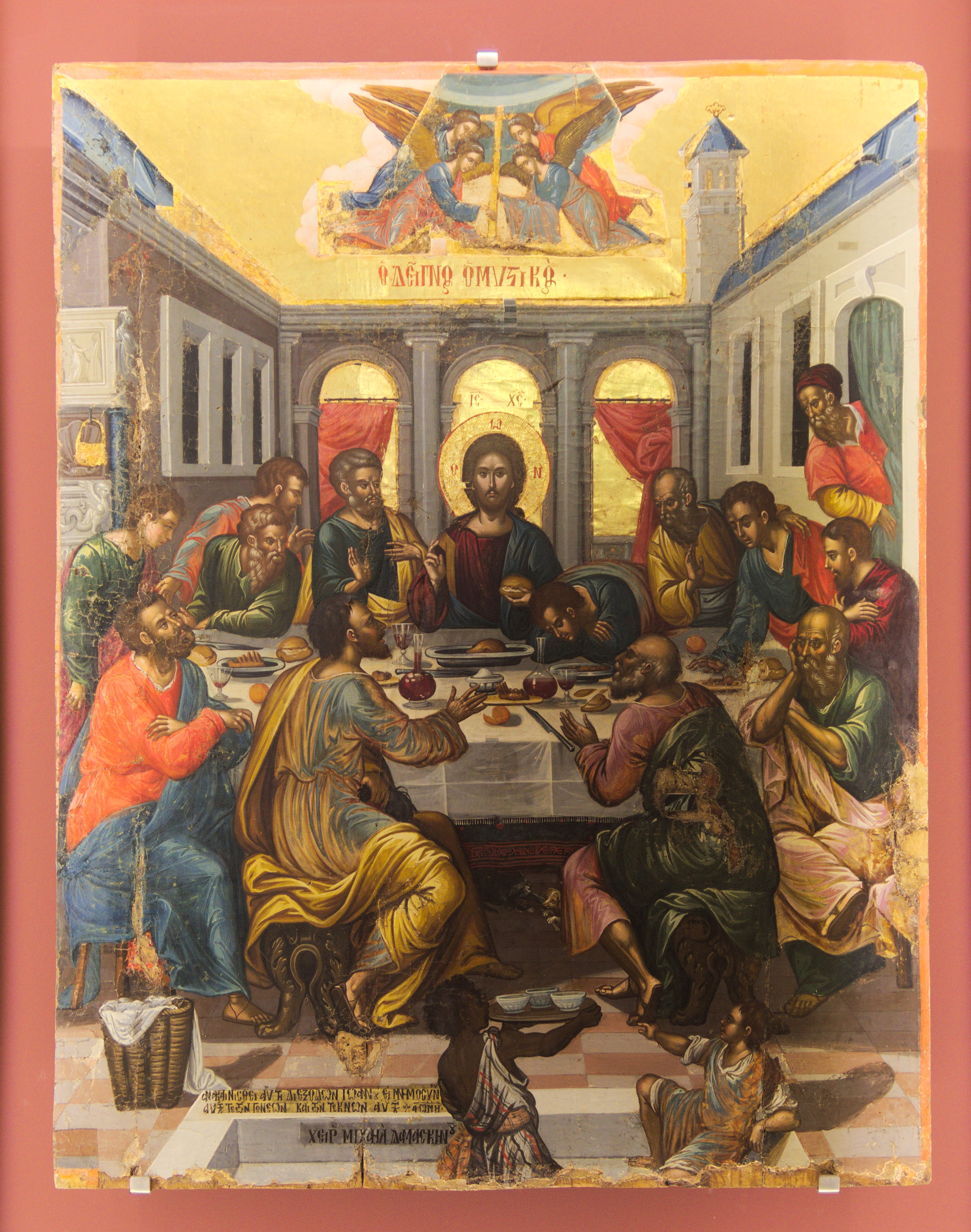
The Last Supper

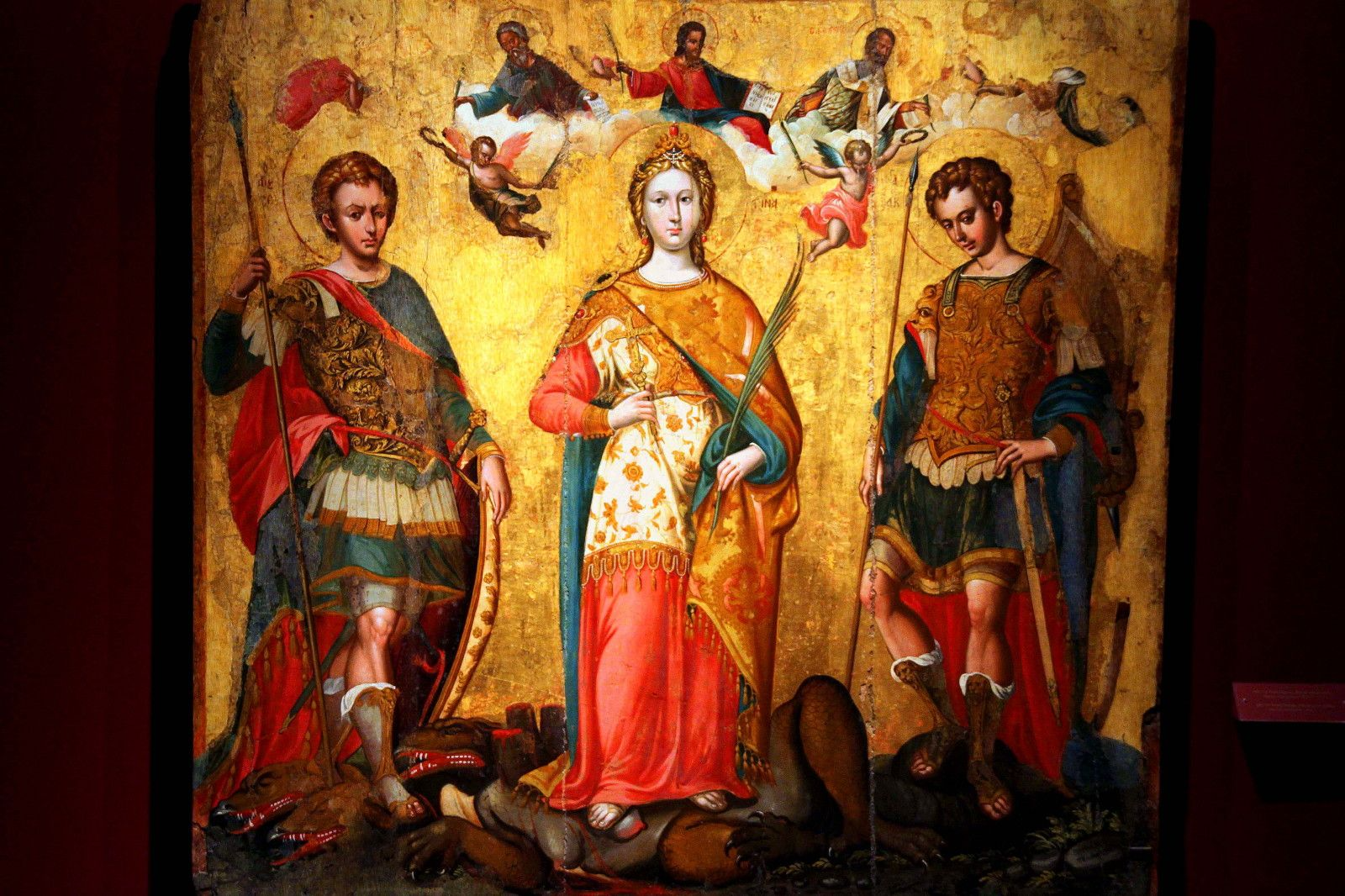
Saints Sergius, Bacchus and Justina

== Notable works ==
- The Last Supper (Damaskinos)
- Wedding at Cana (Damaskinos)
- Crucifixion of Saint Andrew (Damaskinos)
- Adoration of the Kings (Damaskinos)
- Stoning of Stephen (Damaskinos)
- Virgin of the Burning Bush (Damaskinos)
- Tribute to the Eucharist (Damaskinos)
- Madonna del Rosario (Damaskinos)

== See also ==
- Cretan School
- Heptanese School
- Byzantine art
- Maniera greca

== Bibliography ==
- Drakopoulou, Evgenia (2010). Έλληνες Ζωγράφοι μετά την Άλωση (1450–1830). Τόμος 3: Αβέρκιος - Ιωσήφ [Greek Painters after the Fall of Constantinople (1450–1830). Volume 3: Averkios - Joseph]. Athens, Greece: Center for Modern Greek Studies, National Research Foundation. ISBN 978-960-7916-94-5.
- Tselenti-Papadopoulou, Niki G. (2002). Οι Εικονες της Ελληνικης Αδελφοτητας της Βενετιας απο το 16ο εως το Πρωτο Μισο του 20ου Αιωνα: Αρχειακη Τεκμηριωση [The Icons of the Greek Brotherhood of Venice from 1600 to First Half of the 20th Century]. Athens: Ministry of Culture Publication of the Archaeological Bulletin No. 81. ISBN 960-214-221-9.
