= Tel Qana =

Archaeological site in Israel

Tel Qana (Arabic: Tall el-Mukhmar/تل المخمار, Hebrew: תל קנה) is an archaeological site in the Yarkon river basin, near the confluence of Wadi Qana and the Yarkon. It is situated 3 km east of Ramat HaSharon, 5 km south of Ra'anana, and 4.5 km northwest of Tel Afek. The mound spans an area of 2.5 hectares.It includes finds from the Early, Middle, and Late Bronze Ages, Iron Age I–II, and the Persian, Roman, and Byzantine periods.

== Etymology ==
The Crusader name of the site was Filie de Comar. It is mentioned in a boundary description in Hasseki Sultan imaret's endowment deed, dated to 1552 as Tall bin muḫmār “the mound of Mukhmar.” Muḫmār might be an ancient Canaanite/Biblical Hebrew survival of the word mkmr “snare”.

The modern Hebrew name of the site derives from Wadi Qana, near which it stands.

== Significant finds ==
A sizable Late Bronze Age II cist grave that is distinctive in its size, plastering, and east–west orientation is the main find at Tell Qana. The skeleton of a young adult was found buried in the grave with funerary goods of metal and ceramic. The vessels, which belong to the latter part of the Late Bronze Age II, were locally manufactored. The distinctive elements of the cemetery, such as high quality lime plaster, attest to the social standing of the deceased and influence of other civilizations.

In 2024, a 12-year-old girl was hiking below Tel Qana when she found a scarab used as an Egyptian amulet about 3,500 years ago. Two scorpions appear on it, standing head to tail. According to Yitzhak Paz of the Israel Antiquities Authority, “The scorpion symbol represented the Egyptian goddess Serket, who was considered responsible, for protecting pregnant mothers. Such scarab amulets are evidence of Egyptian rule and cultural influence on the region.
