= Cana (radiolarian) =

Scientific classification
- Domain: Eukaryota
- Clade: Sar
- Clade: Rhizaria
- Phylum: Radiolaria
- Class: Polycystina
- Order: Spumellaria
- Family: †Pantanelliidae
- Genus: †Cana; Mekik, 2000

Extinct genus of single-celled organisms

Cana is an extinct genus of prehistoric radiolarians in the extinct family Pantanelliidae. The species C. elegans is from the Cretaceous of northwest Turkey.
