= Canna Creek =

Stream in Mississippi, U.S.

Coordinates: 32.9662416°N 89.3900708°W

Canna Creek is a stream in the U.S. state of Mississippi. It is a tributary to Lobutcha Creek.

Canna is a name derived from the Choctaw language purported to mean "water course". A variant name is "Carey Lake".
