= Cana, California =

Unincorporated community in California, United States

Cana
- Unincorporated community
- Location in California Cana (the United States)
- Coordinates: 39°50′25″N 121°59′39″W
- Country: United States
- State: California
- County: Butte
- Elevation: 167 ft (51 m)

Cana (formerly, Missouri Bend) was a town in Butte County, California, United States, located on the former Southern Pacific Railroad line. It lies at an elevation of 167 feet (51 m). A post office operated in Cana from 1871 to 1913, with brief closures in 1895 and 1900. In the 1870s, the community was on the stage coach routes from Chico; the population then was about 100, mostly farmers growing wheat.
