= Cannae (disambiguation) =

Cannae is a village in Italy.

Cannae may also refer to:

- Battle of Cannae (216 BC) a battle in the Punic Wars of Rome and Carthage famed for the Cannae Tactic of Hannibal
- Battle of Cannae (1018) a battle of the Byzantine Empire
- Cannae (band) U.S. metalcore band
- Cannae drive, a type of reactionless spacecraft drive
- A Scottish English word, meaning "cannot"
- a book titles Cannae written by military strategist Alfred von Schlieffen

== See also ==
- Chennai (formerly Madras), the capital of Tamil Nadu, India
- Canae, an ancient city on the island of Argennusa
- Canna (disambiguation)
