= The Last Supper (Damaskinos) =

Painting by Michael Damaskinos

- Μυστικός Δείπνος (Greek), L'Ultima Cena (Italian)
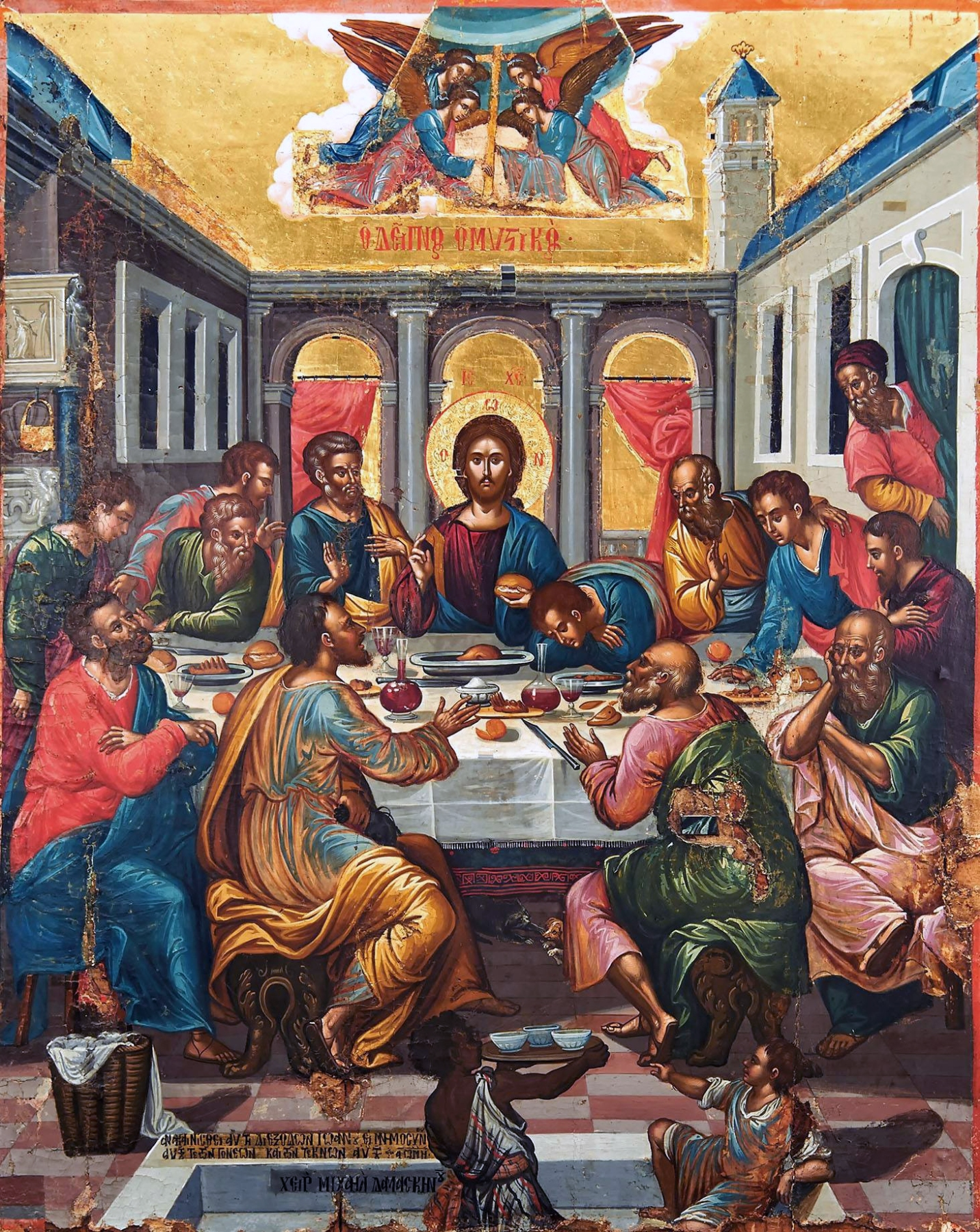
- Artist: Michael Damaskinos
- Year: c. 1591
- Medium: tempera on wood
- Movement: Cretan School
- Subject: The Last Supper
- Dimensions: 109 cm × 84 cm × 2.8 cm (42.9 in × 33.1 in × 1.1 in)
- Location: Monastery of Agia Aikaterini, Heraklion, Crete
- Owner: Collection of Saint Catherine's Monastery Mount Sinai, Egypt

The Last Supper is a tempera painting by Greek painter Michael Damaskinos. He painted in Heraklion, Sicily, Venice, and other parts of Italy. His painting of the Last Supper is considered the Greek Last Supper and is comparative to Leonardo da Vinci's masterpiece painted one hundred years prior. The two painters employed different painting styles but the subjects pose similarities. Damaskinos's painting features a feminine figure similar to that of Leonardo da Vinci's The Last Supper. The Damaskinos Last Supper is now in the Monastery of Agia Aikaterini in Heraklion, Crete. It is part of the collection of Saint Catherine's Monastery near Mount Sinai, Egypt.

== Description ==
The work is egg tempera on wood with dimensions of 109 cm x 84 cm x 2.8 cm (42.9 in x 33.1 in x 1.1 in). It was created towards the end of the 16th century. Jesus is at the center of the painting. Above Jesus are four angels holding a cross. A Greek inscription reading the Last Supper (Ο ΔΕΙΠΝΟ Ο ΜΥΣΤΚΟ) is below the angels. The twelve apostles are gathered at the table. Some figures clearly express their role. Saint Peter is at the right of Jesus symbolizing he is his right hand. Immediately to the left is Judas slumped over, expressing guilt about what he is about to do. Some Apostles are watching in shock. Clearly, the feminine figure is John the Apostle. He is the last figure on our left below the gold bag hanging above his head. The work was inspired by da Vinci's Last Supper, although the orientation of the Apostles is different in the Damaskinos.

The painting depicts in a courtyard rather than an interior. The walls to the left and right denote that they are two different buildings. The floor is elaborately tiled. The items on the table are reminiscent of Damaskinos's painting Wedding at Cana. The wine jugs, silverware, plates, chicken, and sandwiches are all similar to the Wedding at Cana. Jesus is holding a sandwich in his left hand. The meeting is reminiscent of an ancient Greek academic philosophical discussion. The courtyard is filled with clues of Ancient Greek society. Immediately behind Jesus, ancient Greek Doric columns adorn the space. To our left, there are also wall panels with statues and a column. There are also two animals under the table. There was also a dog painted under the table in the Wedding at Cana. Above the animals decorating the table cloth are Minoan symbols. A symbol of ancient Crete.

There were also two children serving the notable event. The figure peeking into our immediate right may have been Damaskinos himself. He wears a hat distinguishing himself from the individuals at the table. His attire also does not bear a resemblance to the clothing of the Apostles. The painter is serving his patrons. The Apostles are all wearing heavenly robes.

== Gallery ==
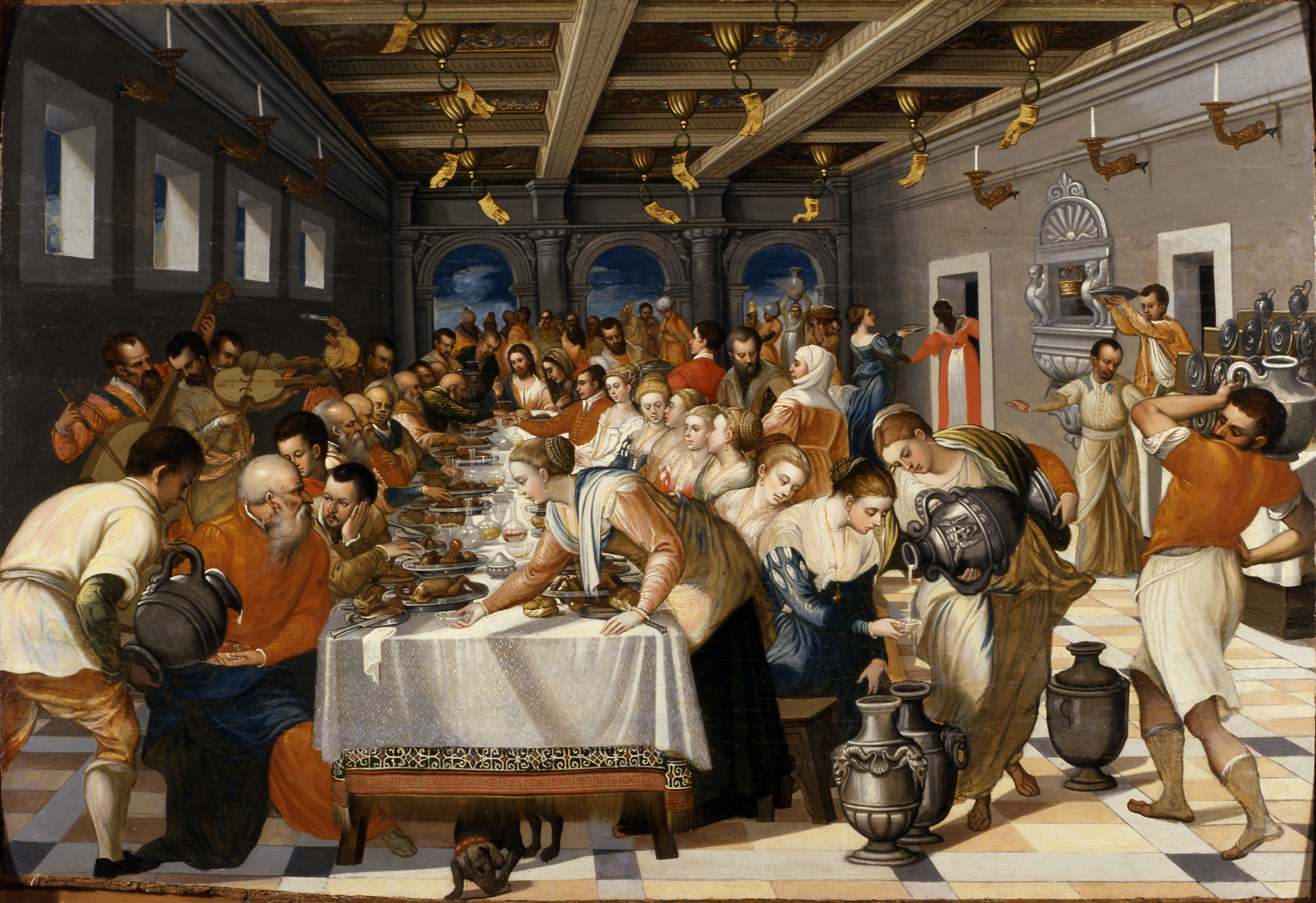
Wedding at Cana

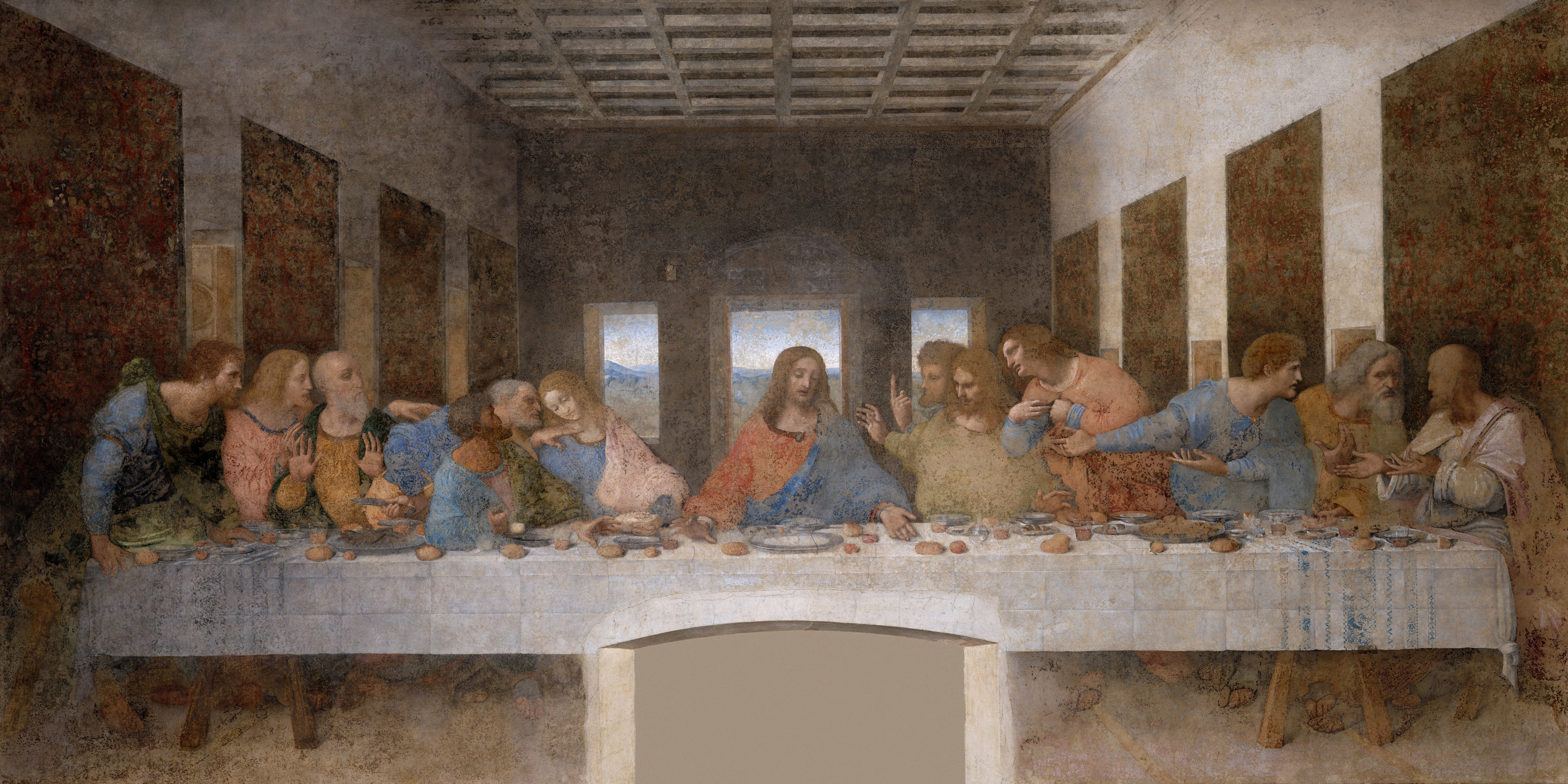
The Last Supper
