= Noah's Ark (Poulakis) =

Painting by Theodore Poulakis

- Η Κιβωτός του Νώε (Greek), Arca di Noè (Italian)
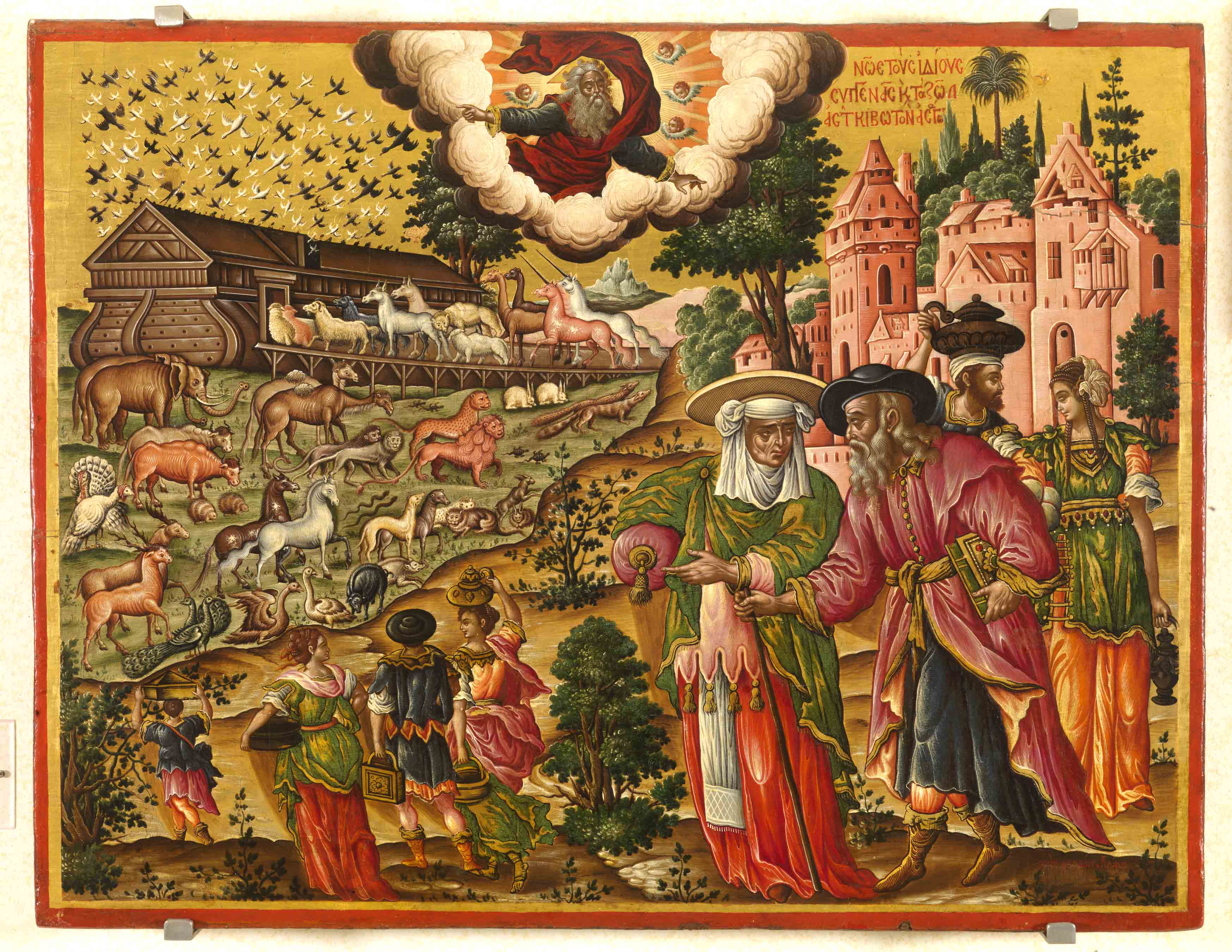
- Artist: Theodore Poulakis
- Year: c. 1635-1692
- Medium: tempera on wood
- Movement: Heptanese School
- Subject: Noah's Ark
- Dimensions: 63 cm × 81 cm (25 in × 31.9 in)
- Location: Hellenic Institute of Venice, Venice, Italy
- Owner: Hellenic Institute of Venice
- Website: Official Website

Noah's Ark is a tempera painting by Theodore Poulakis. Poulakis was a Greek Baroque painter and teacher. He was a member of both the Late Cretan School and the Heptanese School. He is often regarded as the father of the Heptanese School. He was active from 1635 to 1692. By the age of 24, he was living in Venice. He stayed in the city for thirteen years. He was involved in local politics. He frequently traveled all over the Ionian Islands and settled in Corfu. He also regularly returned to Venice. Over 130 of his paintings have survived and can be found all over the world.

Greek painters followed the traditional maniera greca. Their art was heavily influenced by Venetian painting. Another important characteristic in Greek art during the Baroque and Rococo periods was the migration to engravings. Some painters used Italian, Dutch, and Flemish engravings as their inspiration. Some of the engravers were Cornelis Cort, Adriaen Collaert, Hieronymus Wierix, Jan Wierix, Hendrick Goltzius, and Francesco Villamena. Noah's Ark was influenced by an engraving of Jan Sadeler. Two other notable engravers from the same family were Raphael Sadeler I, and Aegidius Sadeler II.

Noah's Ark was an extremely popular theme used by countless artists. A popular version was finished by Flemish painter Maerten de Vos. Sadeler used the painting as a prototype for one of his popular engravings entitled Noah's Ark. Poulakis used the engraving as a model for his version of Noah's Ark. Sadeler and his family moved to Venice from Antwerp. They had an active workshop during the later part of the 16th century and the early 17th century. Many Greek and Italian painters were exposed to their work. Sadeler brought Flemish art to the Greek and Italian world of painting. Konstantinos Tzanes's painting Mary Magdalene used one of Sadeler's engravings as the model for his work. Tzane's Mary Magdalene and Poulaki's Noah's Ark are part of the collection of the Hellenic Institute of Venice.

== Description ==
The painting is egg tempera and gold leaf on a wood panel. The width of the work is 81 cm (31.9 in) and the height is 63.5 cm (25 in). The works of de Vos and Sadeler share common characteristics with Poulaki's work. Poulaki's painting more closely resembles Sadeler's engraving. Both works feature similar figures. The major differences are the upper central figure of God. The figures also appear larger in Poulaki's painting. God is surrounded by angel heads atop wings. He is covered in a red drapery. His majestic garment floats in space, it is painted in rich detail. The folds of fabric are clearly visible. The artists used an advanced shadowing method.

Noah and his wife are in the foreground. The artist demonstrates a mixture of Flemish, Italian and Greek art prevalent at that time. Noah's wife Naamah holds a pillow under her right arm as she points to the ark and looks sternly into Noah's eyes. The garments were influenced by the clothing of the Ionian Islands and Venice.

Naamah's garment is decorated with ornate tassels. Noah and his wife are wearing fashionably trendy hats. Noah is carrying a very important book under his left arm. Behind the main figures are their relatives. The entourage exited a massive palace. They are headed towards the ark. The two figures behind Noah both look into each other's eyes. The man has an elaborately decorated vase on his head. The woman's hair is braided. She holds an urn in her left hand. The remaining four figures to our left, closer to the animals are carrying important items to the ark. There are eight human figures in total.

The animals are a mixture of elephants, camels, wild cats, snakes, rabbits, turkeys, and other creatures. The animals that stand out the most are the two unicorns on the platform entering the ark, one is white and the other brown. The ark, castle, and figures reflect the painting's complex three-dimensional characteristics. An elaborate mixture of birds are flying over the ark. The Greek inscription says: "ΧΕΙΡ ΘΕΟΔΩΡΟΥ ΠΟΥΛΑΚΗ, ΝΩΕ ΤΟΥΣ ΙΔΙΟΥΣ ΣΥΓΓΕΝΕΙΣ Κ[ΑΙ] ΤΑ ΖΩΑ ΕΙΣ ΤΗΝ ΚΙΒΩΤΟΝ ΕΙΣΑΓΩΝ" (By the hand of Theodore Poulakis Noah and his Relatives with Animals Enter the Ark).

The icon has a detailed history. The painting was cataloged in 1700. It belonged to the Greek Brotherhood of Venice. It was completed sometime during the later part of the 1600s. The work was also cataloged in 1770, 1847, and 1882. In 1904, the catalog mentions the work was a painting on wood created by Poulakis. The icon's signature was authenticated in 1949. The 1949 catalog also revealed that the painting was located in the conference room of the Greek Brotherhood of Venice.

== Gallery ==
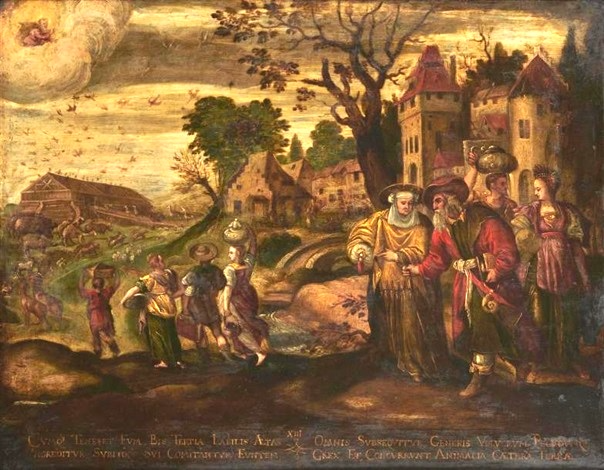
Maerten de Vos Noah's Ark

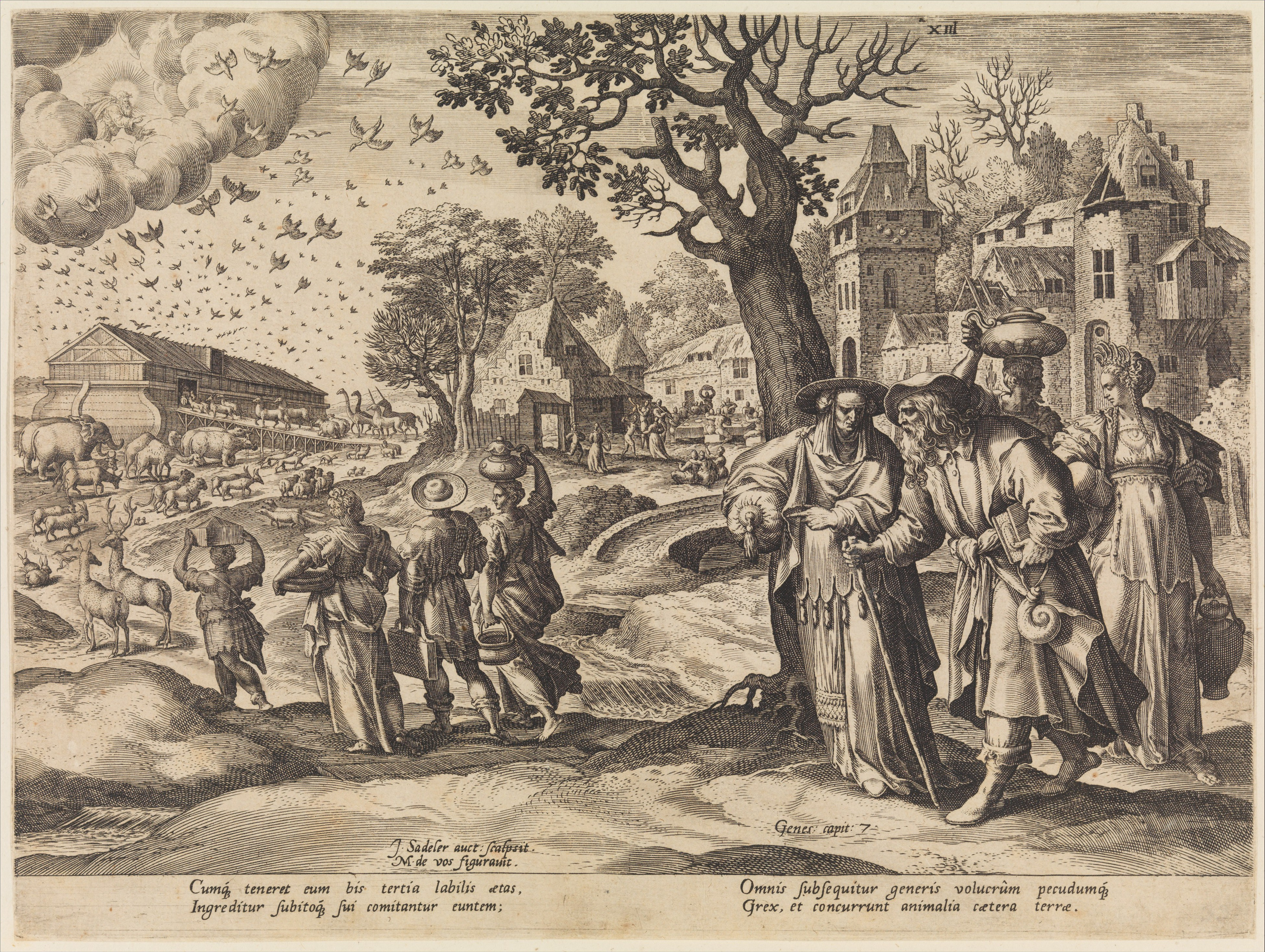
Jan Sadeler I Engraving
