= Venediktos Emporios =

Greek Renaissance painter (1565–1628)

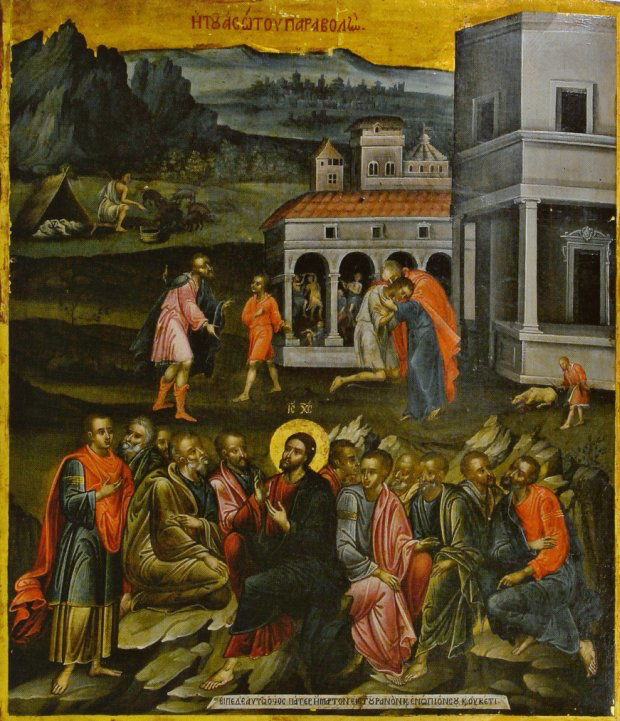
- The Parable of the Prodigal Son
- Born: 1565; Chania, Crete, Republic of Venice
- Died: 1628 (aged 62–63); Venice, Republic of Venice
- Notable work: Last Supper (AI-Generated Color Version)
- Movement: Cretan school
- Occupation: Painter
- Years active: 1600–1628
- Era: 17th century
- Style: Maniera Greca

Venediktos Emporios (Greek: Εμπόριος Βενέδικτος; 1620–1685) was a Greek painter who was active during the 17th century in Venice, Italy. The Greek Orthodox church in Venice known as San Giorgio dei Greci was an epicenter for Greek painters. During the 16th and 17th centuries the church commissioned works from Giovanni Kyprios, Michael Damaskinos, Emmanuel Tzanes, Leos Moskos and Emporios. Emporios and his contemporaries were representatives of the Cretan school of painting. One of his notable works can be found at the church inside the Iero (Sanctuary or Chancel) facing the Altar or Holy Table. The massive painting is of the Last Supper and it is located above the Royal Doors on the inner portion of the iconostasis. Emporios has over nine works attributed to him, which can be found at the same church.

Emporios began his art career in Chania, Crete and eventually migrated to Venice, Italy. He was a contractor associated with San Giorgio dei Greci where he received a commission as early as 1602. The painter was also listed in the Libro Capitolare which was an archive of documents dealing with the governance and administration of institutions in Venice. In the Libro, Emporios was listed four times in 1618, 1622, 1623, and 1628 as a representative of the island of Crete.

== Biography ==
Venediktos Emporios was born on the island of Crete in the city of Chania. The city was also home to two other famous Greek painters El Greco and Konstantinos Paleokapas. Not much is known about Emporios except for his affiliation with San Giorgio dei Greci and that he used the pseudonym Benin Borin. His painting activity ranged from 1602 to 1628 in Venice. His first commission was in 1602 for the Last Supper which was a composition based on a design by Marcantonio Raimondi. In 1886, an Italian workshop used Emporios' Descent into Hell as a model for a large mosaic representation with a similar theme for the North Wall of San Giorgio dei Greci. An example of the painter's signature is: Benin Borin dipingeva nei primi anni del secolo XVII (Benin Borin painted in the early 17th century)

== Gallery ==
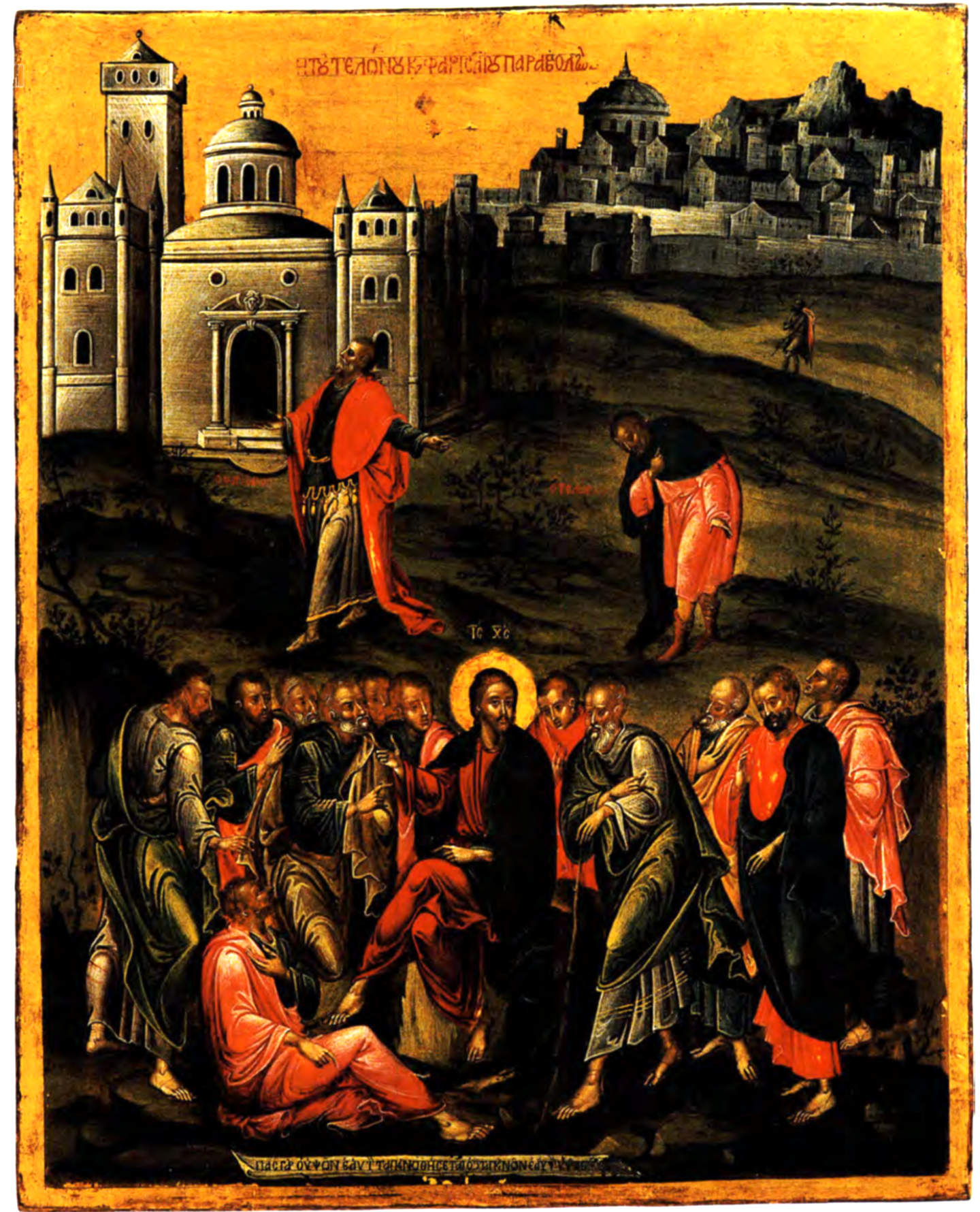
The Parable of the Pharisee and the Tax Collector

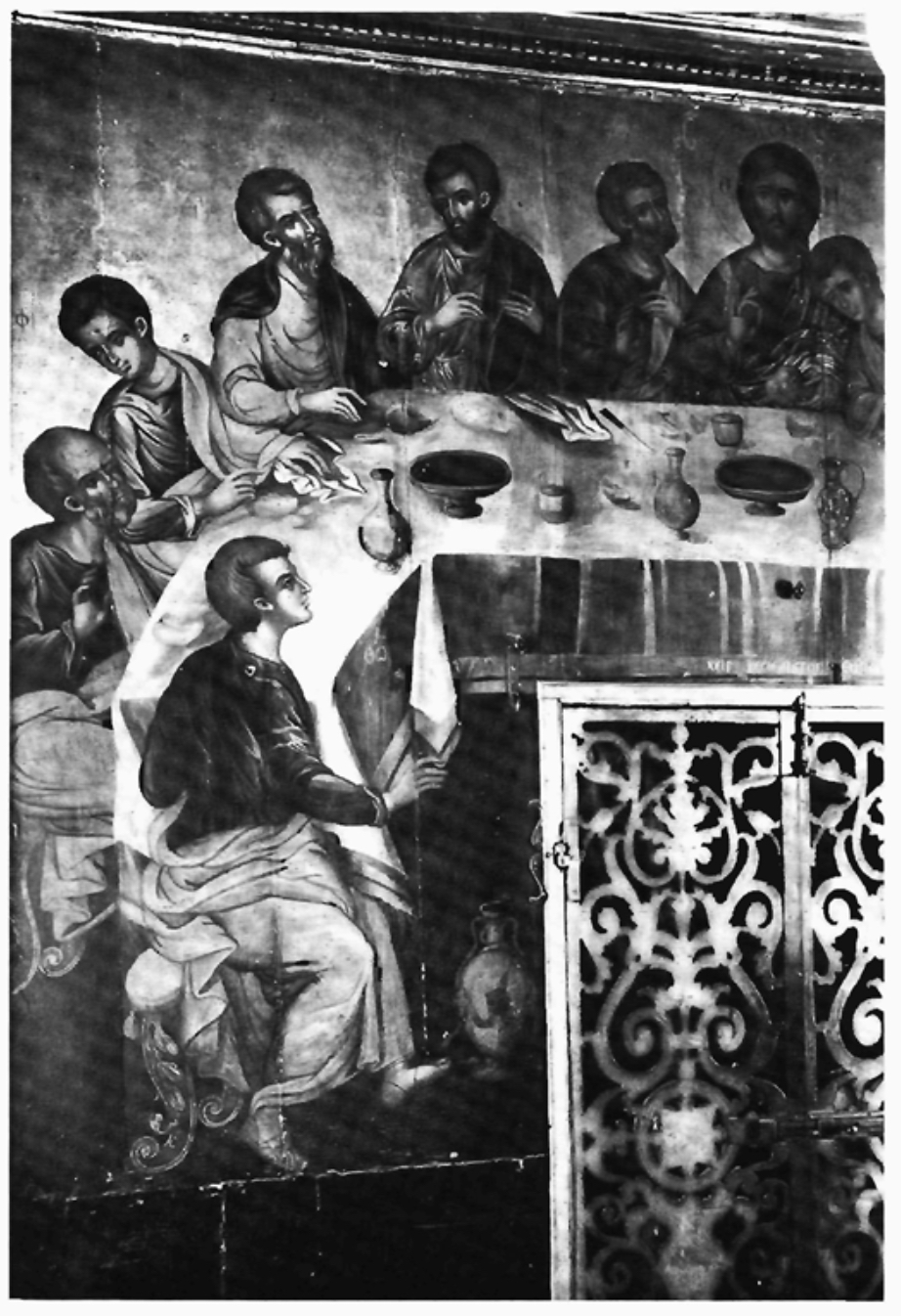
The Last Supper

== Bibliography ==
- Tselenti-Papadopoulou, Niki G. (2002). Οι Εικονες της Ελληνικης Αδελφοτητας της Βενετιας απο το 16ο εως το Πρωτο Μισο του 20ου Αιωνα: Αρχειακη Τεκμηριωση [The Icons of the Greek Brotherhood of Venice from 1600 to First Half of the 20th Century] (PDF) (in Greek). Athens: Ministry of Culture Publication of the Archaeological Bulletin No. 81. ISBN 960-214-221-9.
- Hatzidakis, Manolis (1987). Έλληνες Ζωγράφοι μετά την Άλωση (1450–1830). Τόμος 1: Αβέρκιος – Ιωσήφ [Greek Painters after the Fall of Constantinople (1450–1830). Volume 1: Averkios – Iosif] (in Greek). Athens: Center for Modern Greek Studies, National Research Foundation. hdl:10442/14844. ISBN 960-7916-01-8.
- Maltezou, Chrysa A (2000). Η Βενετια των Ελληνων [Venice of the Greeks] (in Greek). Athens, Greece: Ekdoseis Genous. ISBN 9789608460140.
