= Casa Venier =

Palace in Venice, Italy

Coordinates: 45°26′14.19″N 12°20′28.27″E

Casa Venier is a small Gothic-style palace on the north eastern side of Campo Santa Maria Formosa, adjacent to the complex of Palazzi Donà in the Sestiere of Castello, Venice, Italy.

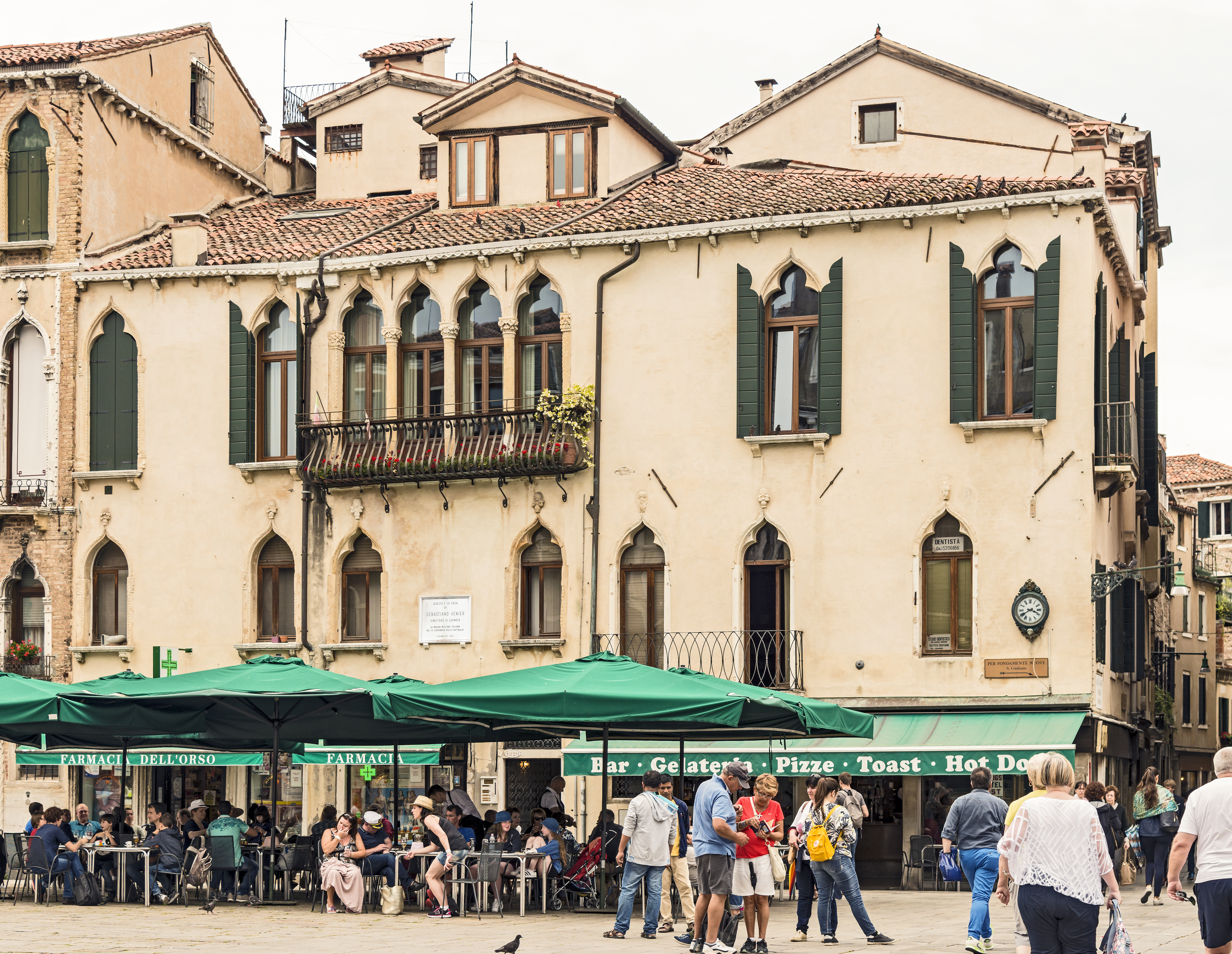
Casa Venier

== History ==
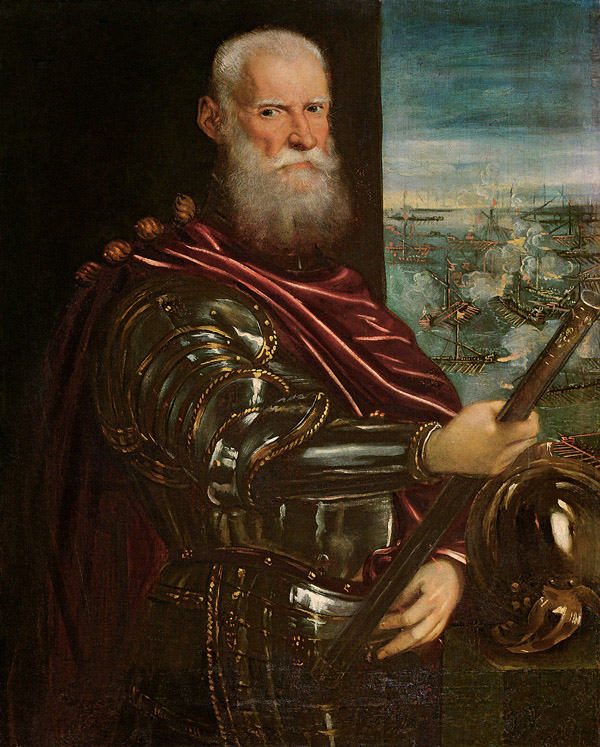
Sebastiano Venier in a portrait of Tintoretto

This house was built in the 15th century, and is most notable as being the birthplace of Doge Sebastiano Venier, who led the Venetians during the Battle of Lepanto in 1571. In 1971, the Italian navy placed a plaque on the house, commemorating the birthplace of this Admiral.
