= Palazzo Priuli Ruzzini Loredan =

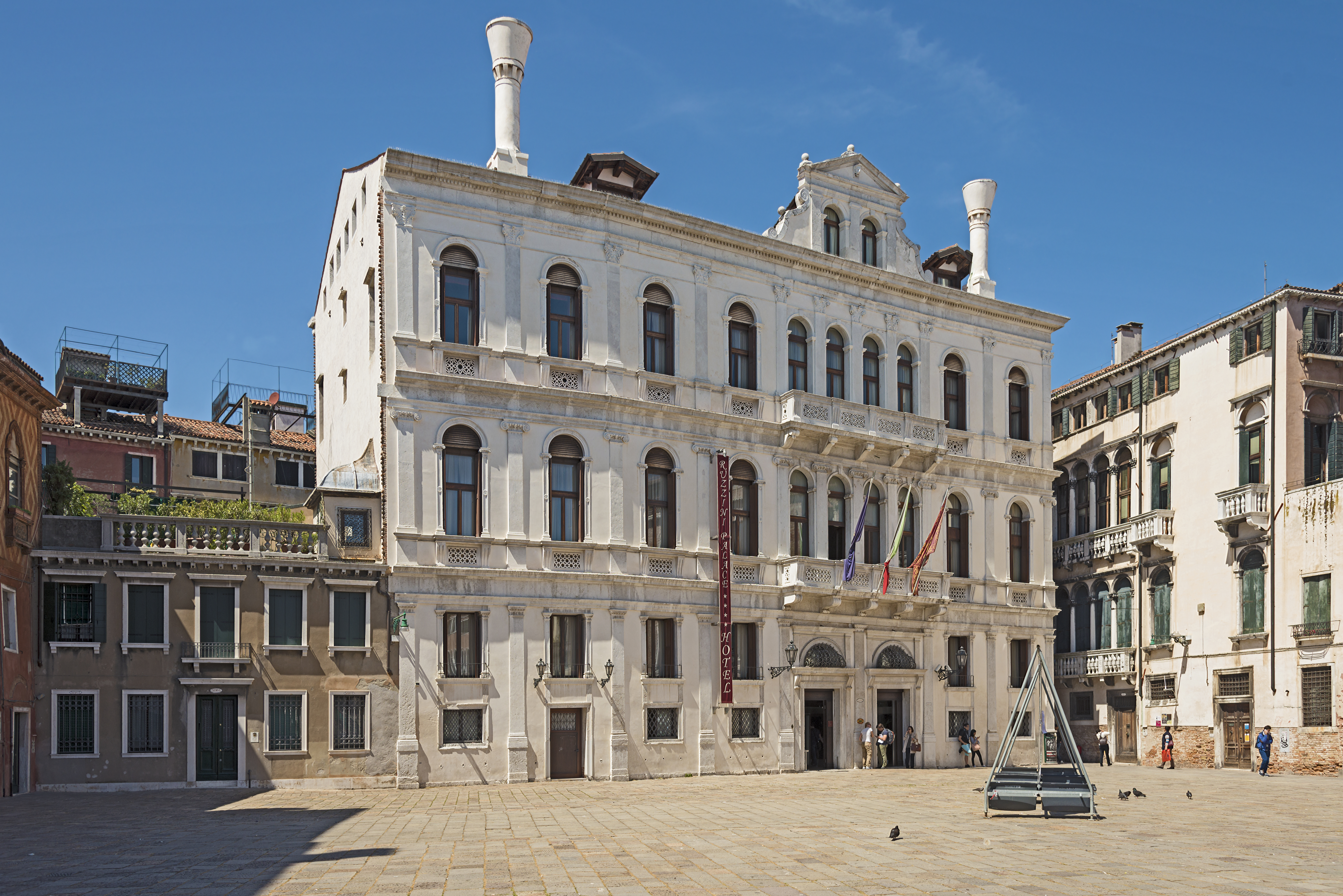
- The Palazzo overlooking Campo Santa Maria Formosa
- Interactive map of the Palazzo Priuli Ruzzini Loredan area
- Alternative names: Palazzo Loredan at Campo Santa Maria Formosa
- Etymology: by the Priuli, Ruzzini and Loredan families

General information
- Architectural style: Renaissance, Baroque
- Location: Castello 5866, Venice, Italy

Technical details
- Floor count: 3 + mezzanine

Design and construction
- Architect: Bartolomeo Manopola

Other information
- Number of rooms: 28 bedrooms

Website
- https://www.ruzzinipalace.com/description/

Palazzo Priuli Ruzzini Loredan, also called Palazzo Loredan at Campo Santa Maria Formosa, is a late 16th-century palace located at Campo Santa Maria Formosa in the Castello district of Venice, northern Italy, characterised by features of Renaissance and Baroque-style architecture on its façades.

== History ==
The Palazzo was built as a noble residence of the Ruzzini in the late sixteenth century, a project attributed to architect Bartolomeo Manopola. The previous residences of the Ruzzini family had in fact been destroyed by a fire in 1586. Carlo Ruzzini, 113th doge of the Republic of Venice, also belonged to this family, divided into numerous branches: a talented diplomat, Venetian ambassador to the main European courts (Spain, Vienna, Constantinople), he ascended to the ducal throne in 1732. His only link with this building lies in his arrangement according to which he had established that this residence would be inhabited perpetually by his heirs. In the 18th century he had Gregorio Lazzarini paint the frescoes in the interior halls. In 1801, Count Pietro Priuli, as the founding family became extinct, became the owner of the building. The building, which at the beginning of the 21st century was in a state of profound neglect, has been completely renovated and currently houses a hotel.

== Architecture ==
The palace has two façades: a Renaissance one on the canal and a late Renaissance one on the Campo.

The façade overlooking the canal is characterised by the round openings of the two noble floors and by a thick serrated cornice. The central part, displaced asymmetrically to the left, is the most interesting: on the ground floor two round portals with a stone frame overlook the water; the upper floors correspond to two orders of four-light windows with balustrades.

The main façade, on Campo Santa Maria Formosa, is the more adorned and modern of the two, presenting baroque features, while having the same layout as the façade on the canal. The peculiar elements of this façade are the presence of three types of pilasters, Tuscan on the first floor, Ionic on the second, Corinthian on the third; the presence of string courses and a balustrade for each single lancet window; the presence on the roof of two high chimneys and a large dormer window which, with a mullioned window, tympanum and volutes, continues the façade above four mullioned windows.
