= Marinos Tzanes =

Greek painter and poet (1620–1685)

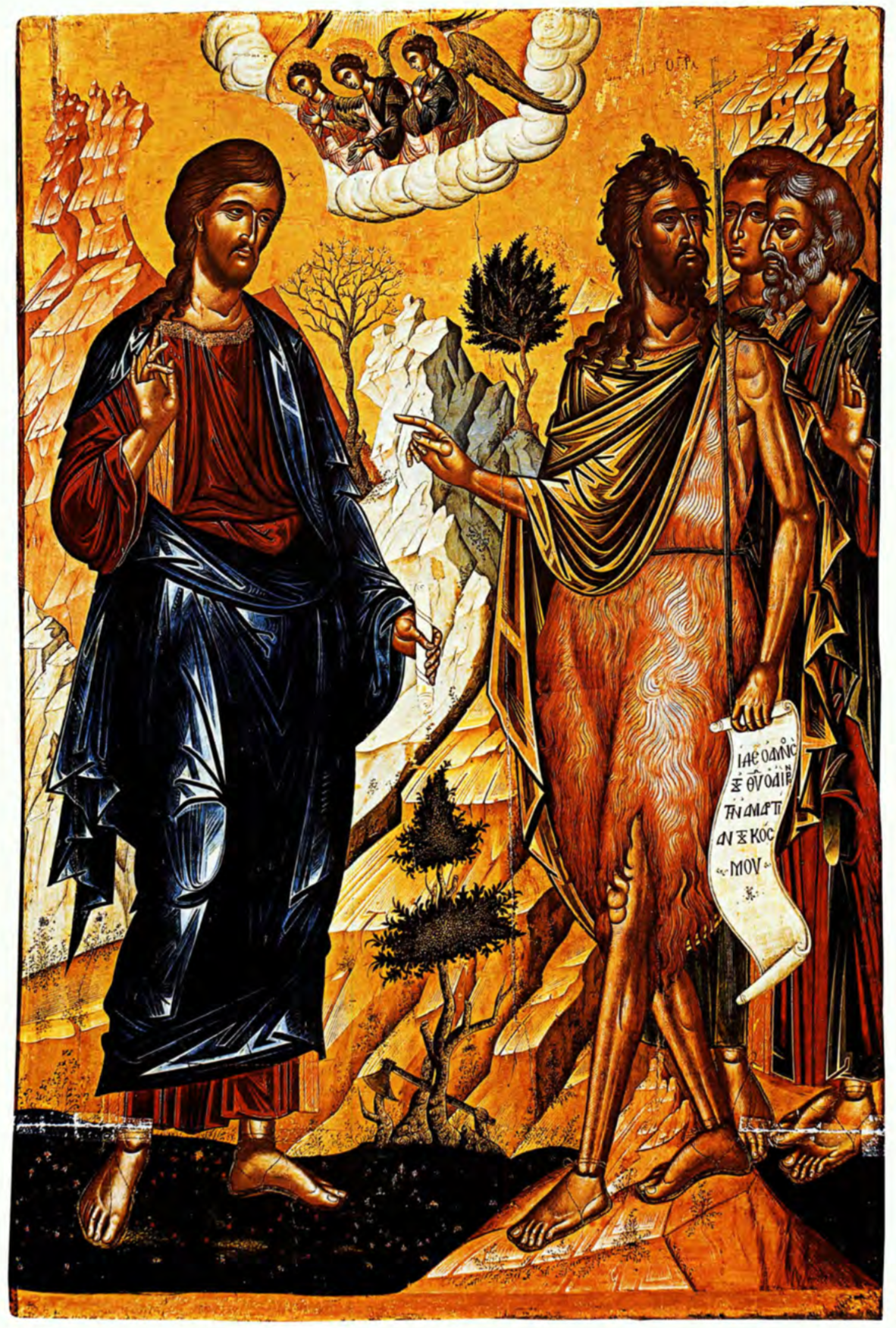
- Christ and John the Baptist
- Born: 1620; Rethymno, Crete, Republic of Venice
- Died: 1685 (aged 64–65); Venice, Republic of Venice
- Occupations: Painter, author
- Known for: The Cretan War
- Relatives: Konstantinos Tzanes; Emmanuel Tzanes

Marinos Tzanes (Greek: Μαρίνος Τζάνες; 1620–1685), also known as Marinos Tzanes Bounialis (Greek: Μαρίνος Τζάνες Μπουνιαλής), was a Greek painter and poet. His most notable work, The Cretan War (Greek: Ο Κρητικός Πόλεμος, romanized: O Kritikos Polemos), was printed in 1681 and is over six hundred pages long. The book is a historical account of the Cretan War between Republic of Venice and the Ottoman Empire and it is accompanied with short poems. None of Marinos' signed works have survived. His brother Emmanuel Tzanes was one of the most prolific painters of the 17th century and has one of the largest existing catalogs of Greek-style paintings. His other brother Konstantinos Tzanes also has existing works. All three brothers were affiliated with San Giorgio dei Greci. The family settled in Venice after 1650. He was a prominent member of the Greek community in Venice.

== History ==
Marinos was born on the island of Crete around 1620. He was the middle son of an aristocratic and educated family from Rethymnon. His older brother Emmanuel Tzanes became a priest sometime before 1635. His youngest brother was Konstantinos Tzanes. All three brothers were painters. They fled Crete around 1646. The family first traveled to Corfu. Both of his brothers completed major works while they were on the island. They finally migrated to Venice after 1655. Records indicate Marino was a prominent member of the Greek community of Venice until 1685. An important historical document demonstrates that Emmanuel received 52 ducats for icons he painted with Marinos around 1662. Marino's most important work was a poem about the Cretan War. He wrote a historical narrative of the Cretan War between (1645–1669). He wrote the story based on personal experience, eyewitness testimonies, and other oral written sources to address his fellow refugees and compatriots. The book was first printed in Venice around 1681 with the help of his older brother Emmanuel Tzanes. The book is over six hundred pages. The book chronicles different prominent families from the island of Crete and different events during the war. The book also features countless poems.

== Literary works ==
- The Cretan War (O Kritikos Polemos) Ο Κρητικός Πόλεμος 1681

== Bibliography ==
- Tselenti-Papadopoulou, Niki G. (2002). Οι Εικονες της Ελληνικης Αδελφοτητας της Βενετιας απο το 16ο εως το Πρωτο Μισο του 20ου Αιωνα: Αρχειακη Τεκμηριωση [The Icons of the Greek Brotherhood of Venice from 1600 to First Half of the 20th Century]. Athens: Ministry of Culture Publication of the Archaeological Bulletin No. 81. ISBN 960-214-221-9.
- Hatzidakis, Manolis; Drakopoulou, Evgenia (1997). Έλληνες Ζωγράφοι μετά την Άλωση (1450-1830). Τόμος 2: Καβαλλάρος - Ψαθόπουλος [Greek Painters after the Fall of Constantinople (1450-1830). Volume 2: Kavallaros – Psathopoulos]. Athens: Center for Modern Greek Studies, National Research Foundation. hdl:10442/14088. ISBN 960-7916-00-X.
