= San Giorgio dei Greci =

Church in Venice, Italy

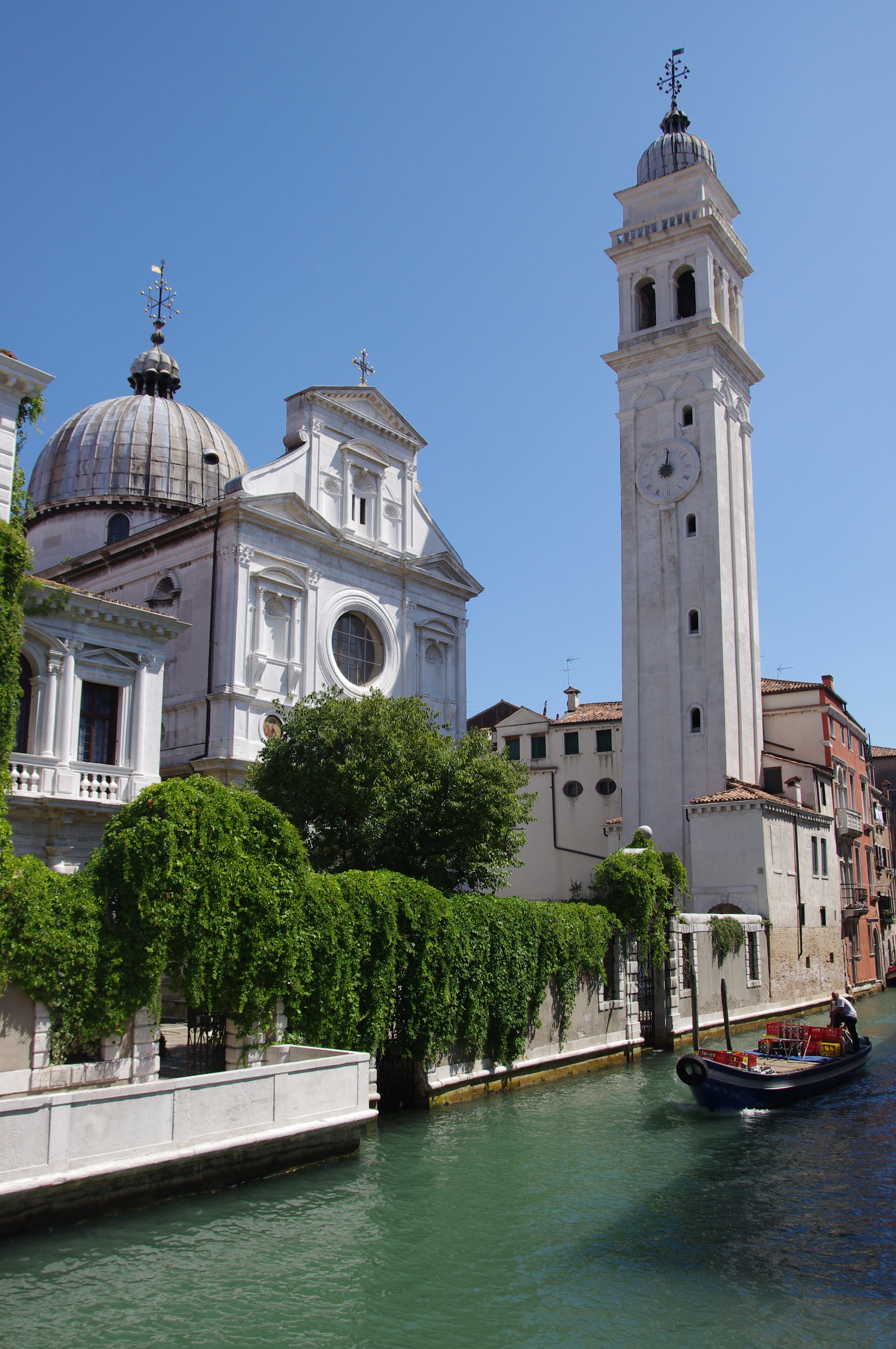
- San Giorgio dei Greci with its campanile
- San Giorgio dei Greci
- 45.4354°N 12.3448°E
- Country: Italy
- Denomination: Greek Orthodox

History
- Dedication: Saint George

Architecture
- Groundbreaking: 1539
- Completed: 1573

San Giorgio dei Greci (Greek: Ἅγιος Γεώργιος τῶν Ἑλλήνων, romanized: ´Agios Geórgios ton Ellínon, lit. 'Saint George of the Greeks') is a church in the sestiere (neighborhood) of Castello, Venice, northern Italy. It was the center of the Scuola dei Greci, the Confraternity of the Greeks in Venice. Around this period there was a similar church in Naples called Santi Pietro e Paolo dei Greci. There was also a Greek Brotherhood of Naples.

== History ==
For centuries, despite the close ties of Venice to the Byzantine world (Venice was part of the Byzantine Empire), the Greek Orthodox rite was not permitted in Venice. In 1498, the Greek community in Venice gained the right to found the Scuola de San Nicolò dei Greci, a confraternity which aided members of that community. In 1539, after protracted negotiations, the papacy allowed the construction of the church of San Giorgio, financed by a tax on all ships from the Orthodox world.

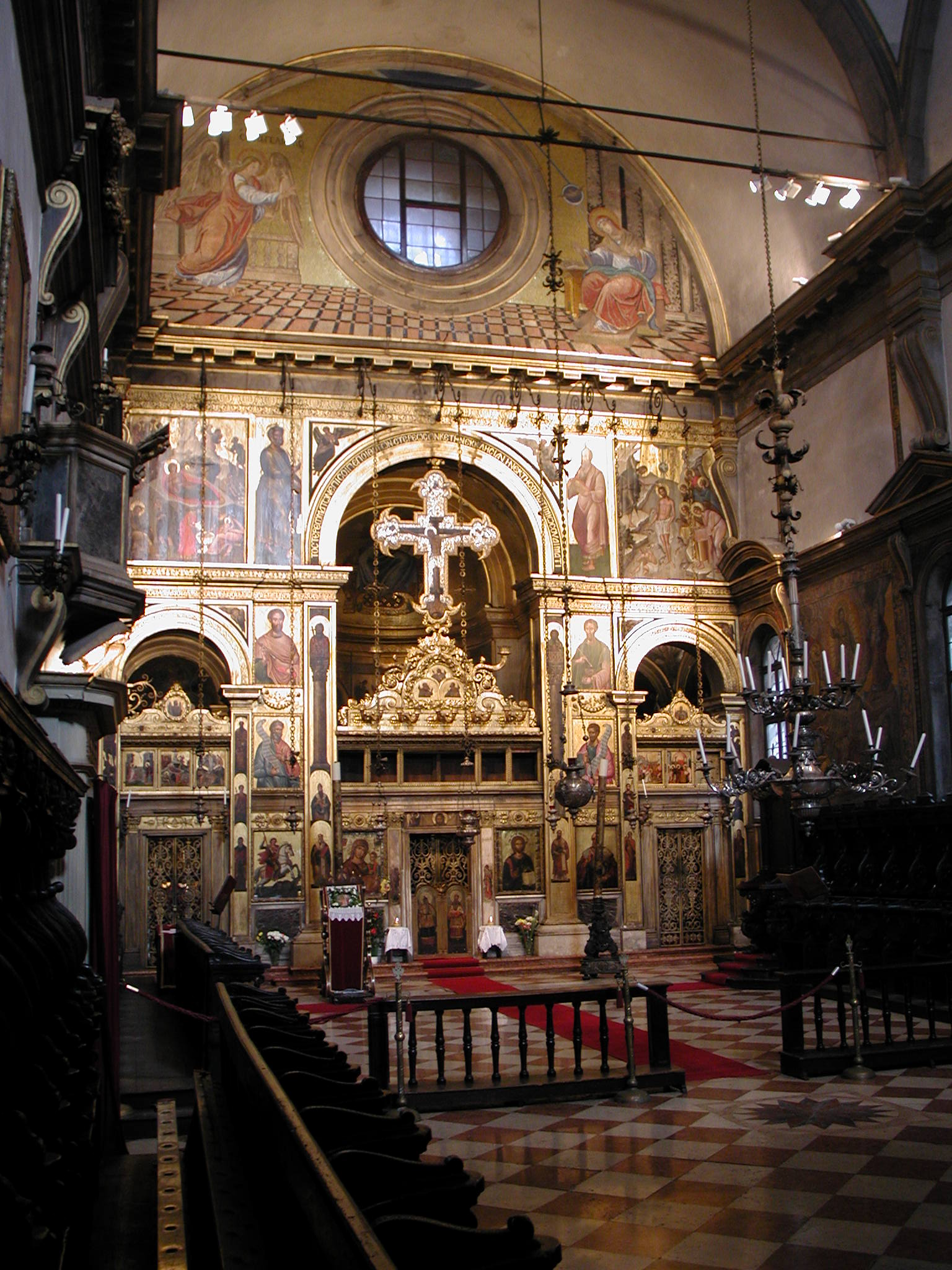
The Iconostasis of the church

Construction was started by Sante Lombardo, and from 1548, by Giannantonio Chiona. The belltower was built in 1592. The interior has a monument to Gabriele Seviros (1619) by Baldassarre Longhena. The dome of the church was frescoed with the Last Judgement (1589–93) by Giovanni Kyprios. Other artists who completed work for the church were Markos Bathas, Thomas Bathas, Venediktos Emporios, and Michael Damaskinos. Emanuele Tzane-Buniales, a priest and hagiographer from Crete, frescoed the Saints Simeon and Alypios, ascetic hermits, atop the pilasters. Other famous Greek artists associated with the church were: Konstantinos Tzanes, Philotheos Skoufos, Ioannis Moskos, Leos Moskos and Emmanuel Tzanfournaris.

Amongst the treasures in this church are three icons which Anna Notaras, daughter of Loukas Notaras, the last megas doux of the Byzantine Empire, brought with her to Italy before 1453, and she later gave to the Scuola de San Nicolò dei Greci in trust for when a church observing the Greek Orthodox faith could be constructed. These icons comprise: one of Christ in His glory surrounded by symbols of the four Evangelists and figures of the 12 Apostles; another of Christ Pantokrator; and the third is an image of the Virgin Hodegetria.

Near the church lies the Flanginian School, a Greek teachers' school, which today houses the Hellenic Institute of Byzantine and Post-Byzantine Studies in Venice. The Museum was established by Sophia Antoniadis.

== Michael Damaskinos ==
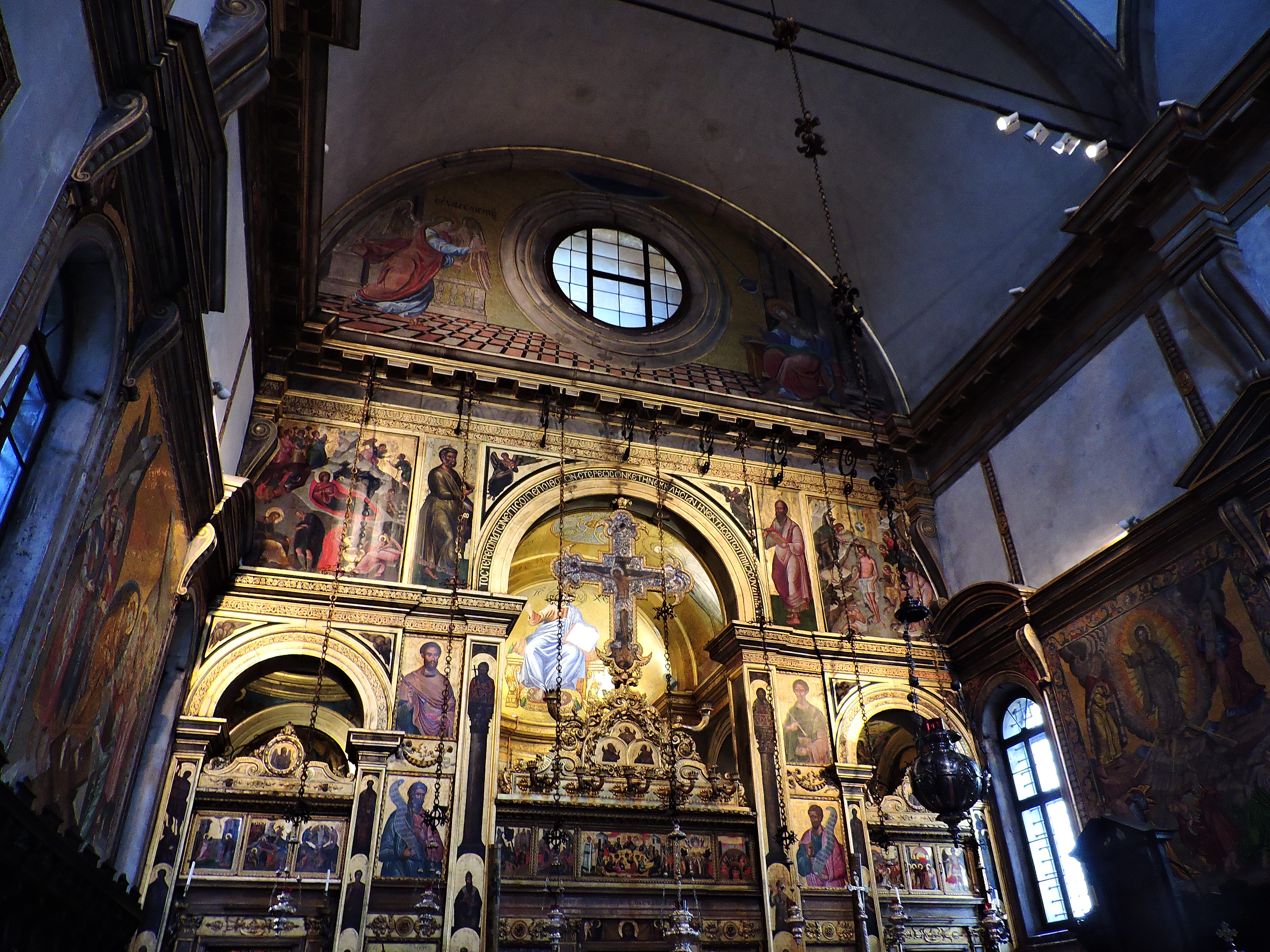
Eighteen of the icons of the Iconostasis were completed by Damaskinos

Between 1560–1583, Michael Damaskinos completed works for the church. Twenty-five of his major works are located in Venice. Twenty of his paintings are part of San Giorgio dei Greci. Eighteen of his icons are part of the iconostasis of the church. One of them portrays the Archangel Michael. Nine of the paintings exhibit the dodekaorto known as the Great feasts in the Eastern Orthodox Church. Two of his works are behind the iconostasis within the holy sanctuary. Four of his works are part of the Hellenic Institute of Venice. The museum and research facility is associated with San Giorgio dei Greci. One of his paintings Wedding at Cana is located at the Museo Correr in Venice.

== Emmanuel Tzanes ==
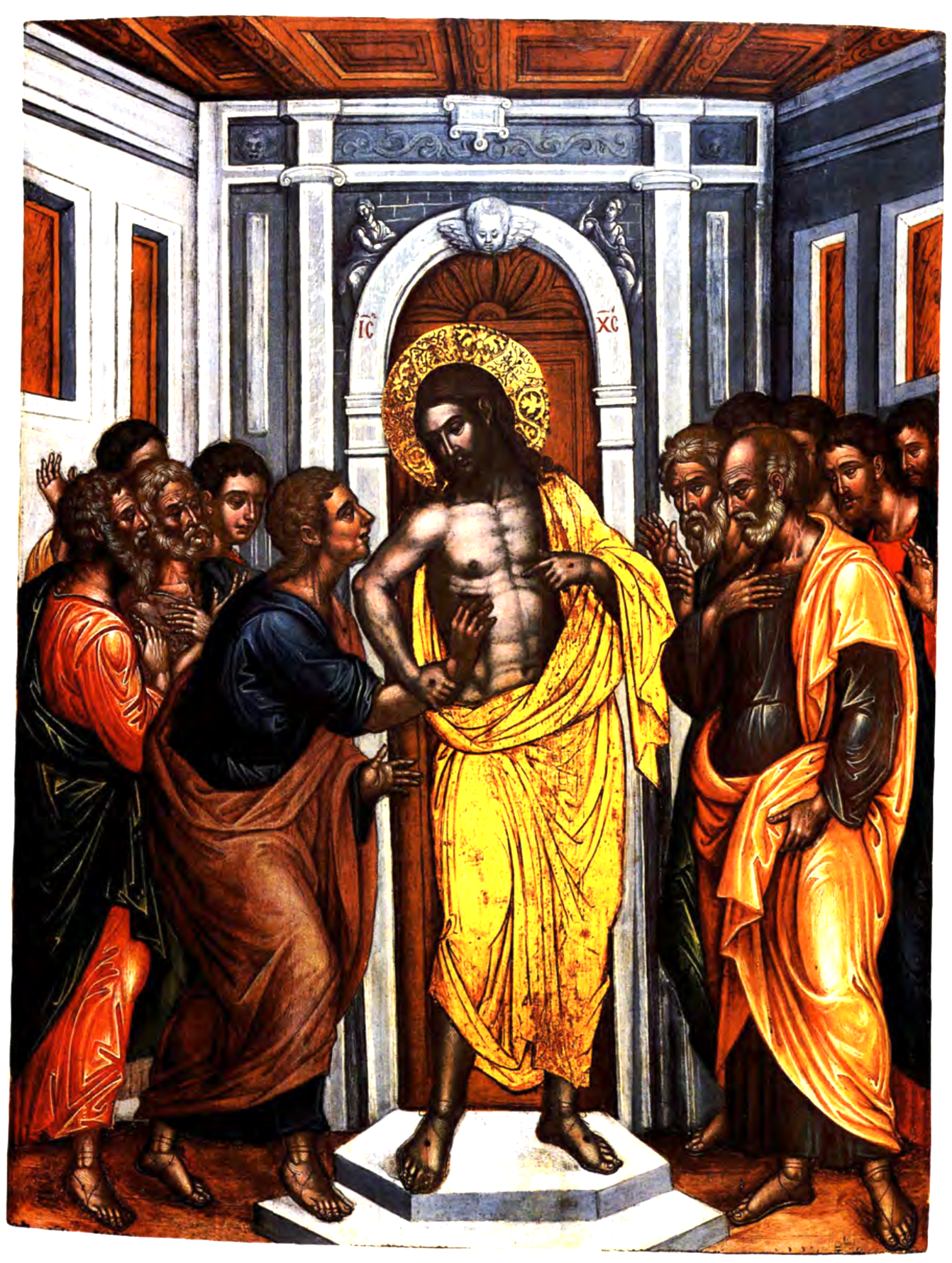
Doubting Thomas Hellenic Institute of Venice

The priesthood of the painter Emmanuel Tzanes at San Giorgio dei Greci, from 1655–1690, was one of the most important periods in the institution's history. Four of Tzanes' paintings are associated with the church: an icon of Alypius on the iconostasis, Abraham and Melchizedek on the panels of the royal doors, a Crucifixion, and Jesus, the Virgin Mary, and John the Baptist on a holy podium (proskinitirio). Thirteen more works are housed at the Hellenic Institute of Venice, a museum and research facility associated with San Giorgio dei Greci. Tzanes' brothers, famous painter Konstantinos Tzanes and poet Marinos Tzanes also lived in Venice and were affiliated with the church. Other affiliated Greek painters of the time were Ioannis Moskos, Leos Moskos and Philotheos Skoufos.

== Priests 1527–1868 ==
- Ioannis Avgerinos (1527–1533) Cephalonia
- Ioannis Stamnos (1533–1540) Koroni
- Michael Savinas (1540) Koroni
- Nikolaos Trizentis (1540) Koroni
- Thomas Avlonitis (1551–1553) Corfu
- Vasileos Varelis or Valeris (1554–1557) Corfu
- Pakomios Makris (1557–1560) (later Archbishop)
- Nikolaos Speiris (1560–1571) Variko
- Ioannis Nathanail (1571) Crete
- Konstantinos Kigalas (1571)
- Gavril Seviros (1571–1573) Monemvasia
- Theofanis Logaras (1573–1575) Cyprus
- Theofanis Filaretos (1576–1579) Cyprus
- Yosef Monachos aka Philanthropinos (1576–1579)
- Georgios Vlastos Pounialetos (1579–1580)Rethimno
- Fotios Palatianos (1580–1589)
- Dionisios Katlianos (1589–1590) Zakynthos
- Antonios Fronimos (1590–1592) Corfu
- Stamatis Oikonomos (1592–1593)
- Stamatis Kounias (1593–1611) Nafplion
- Theofanis Ksenakis (1611) Cyprus
- Arensnios Karkinadas (1611–1613) Zakynthos
- Nikolaos Sofianos (1613–1614) Crete
- Pakomios Doxaras (1616–1618) Zakynthos
- Markos Gliassis (1618–1622)
- Prokoros Gialouris (1622) Zakynthos
- Nikiforos Paskalefs (1622–1628)
- Alexandros Theofylaktos (1628–1630) Corfu
- Matheos Kigalas (1630)
- Petros Kostas (1630–1631) Cyprus
- Ioannis Stilias (1631–1635) Corfu
- Emmanuel Porfiris (1633–1635)
- Theofylaktos Tzanfournaris (1635–1643) Corfu
- Parthenios Darmaris (1643–1649) Kythira
- Antonios Bouboulis (1649–1655) Crete
- Philotheos Skoufos (1655) Crete
- Emmanuel Padouvas (1655–1659)
- Emmanuel Tzanes (1659–1690) Rethimno, Crete
- Gregory Maras (1659–1663) Crete
- Nikiforos Kalormanos (1663–1672)
- Georgios Kyprios (1672–1678)
- Vartholomaos Siropoulos (1678–1680)
- Georgios Giafounis (1680–1690) Cyprus
- Athanasious Protosiggelos (1690–1694)
- Georgios Mayiostas (1694) Crete
- Ioannis Lampoudis (1694)
- Methodios Anthrakites (1696–1699) Ioannina
- Ioannis Avramios (1699) Crete
- Antonios Prassinikos (1699)
- Meletios Papadopoulos (1699–1708)
- Ioannis Patousas (1708) Athens
- Gregory Skopelitis (1708)
- Ioannis Halkefs (1708–1711)
- Venediktos Moskopoulos (1711)
- Georgios Patousas (1711) Athens
- Panagiotis Sinopefs (1713–1714)
- Apostolos Mikos (1714)
- Ioannis Stais (1714)
- Ioannis Vouvoulis (1718) Crete
- Gerasimos Fokas (1718–1720) Cephalonia
- Spyridon Krassas (1720–1726)
- Arsenios Ananiou Papagiorgi (1726–1746)
- Zosimos Mantzavinos (1746–1751)
- Dimitrios Valasamos (1751)
- Antonios Papikinos (1751–1758)
- Spyridon Millias (1758–1760) Corfu
- Giorgios Fatzeas (1760–1765) Kythira
- Apostolos Doukas (1765) Lefkada
- Amvrosios Vitzamanos (1765–1775) Kythira
- Krisanthos Moskopoulos (1775–1783) Cephalonia
- Gerasimos Zigouras (1783–1813)
- Andreas Ardavanis (1813–1820) Cephalonia
- Ioannis Visvardis (1820–1824) Zakynthos
- Theodoritos Karidis (1824–1828) Corfu
- Panagis Farinas (1828–1838) Cephalonia
- Anthimos Mazarakis (1838–1840) Cephalonia
- Gerasimos Kalos (1840–1841) Cephalonia
- Venediktos Desillas (1841–1847) Parga
- Archimandrite Spyridon Zervos (1847–1851) Corfu
- Dionisios (1851–1860)
- Dasillas (1860–1868)
- Evgenios Perdicaris (1868) Lefkada

The church had more than one priest at one given time.

== Other Greek Churches in Italy ==
- Santi Pietro e Paolo dei Greci
- Greek Orthodox Church of San Nicolò dei Greci
- Chiesa Greco Ortodossa di Sant'Andrea Apostolo, Rome Italy

== See also ==
- Theodore Palaiologos (stratiote)
- 16th-century Western domes

== Bibliography ==
- Manno, Antonio (2004). The Rizzoli Art Guides (ed.). The Treasures of Venice. New York: Rizzoli International Publications. pp. 256–257.
- Mathieu Grenet, La fabrique communautaire. Les Grecs à Venise, Livourne et Marseille, 1770–1840, Athens and Rome, École française d'Athènes and École française de Rome, 2016 (ISBN 978-2-7283-1210-8)
- Hatzidakis, Manolis; Drakopoulou, Evgenia (1997). Έλληνες Ζωγράφοι μετά την Άλωση (1450-1830) Τόμος 2: Καβαλλάρος - Ψαθόπουλος [Greek Painters after the Fall of Constantinople (1450-1830). Volume 2: Kavallaros - Psathopoulos]. Athens: Center for Modern Greek Studies, National Research Foundation. hdl:10442/14088. ISBN 960-7916-00-X.
- Drakopoulou, Evgenia (2010). Έλληνες Ζωγράφοι μετά την Άλωση (1450–1830). Τόμος 3: Αβέρκιος - Ιωσήφ [Greek Painters after the Fall of Constantinople (1450–1830). Volume 3: Averkios – Joseph]. Athens, Greece: Center for Modern Greek Studies, National Research Foundation. ISBN 978-960-7916-94-5.
- Tselenti-Papadopoulou, Niki G. (2002). Οι Εικονες της Ελληνικης Αδελφοτητας της Βενετιας απο το 16ο εως το Πρωτο Μισο του 20ου Αιωνα: Αρχειακη Τεκμηριωση [The Icons of the Greek Brotherhood of Venice from 1600 to First Half of the 20th Century]. Athens: Ministry of Culture Publication of the Archaeological Bulletin No. 81. ISBN 960-214-221-9.
- Veloudou, Ioannou (1872). Η Χρυσαλλισ [The Krysallis Historical Record of San Giorgio dei Greci]. Venice: San Giorgio dei Greci.
