= Giovanni Kyprios =

Greek painter

Ioannis Kyprios
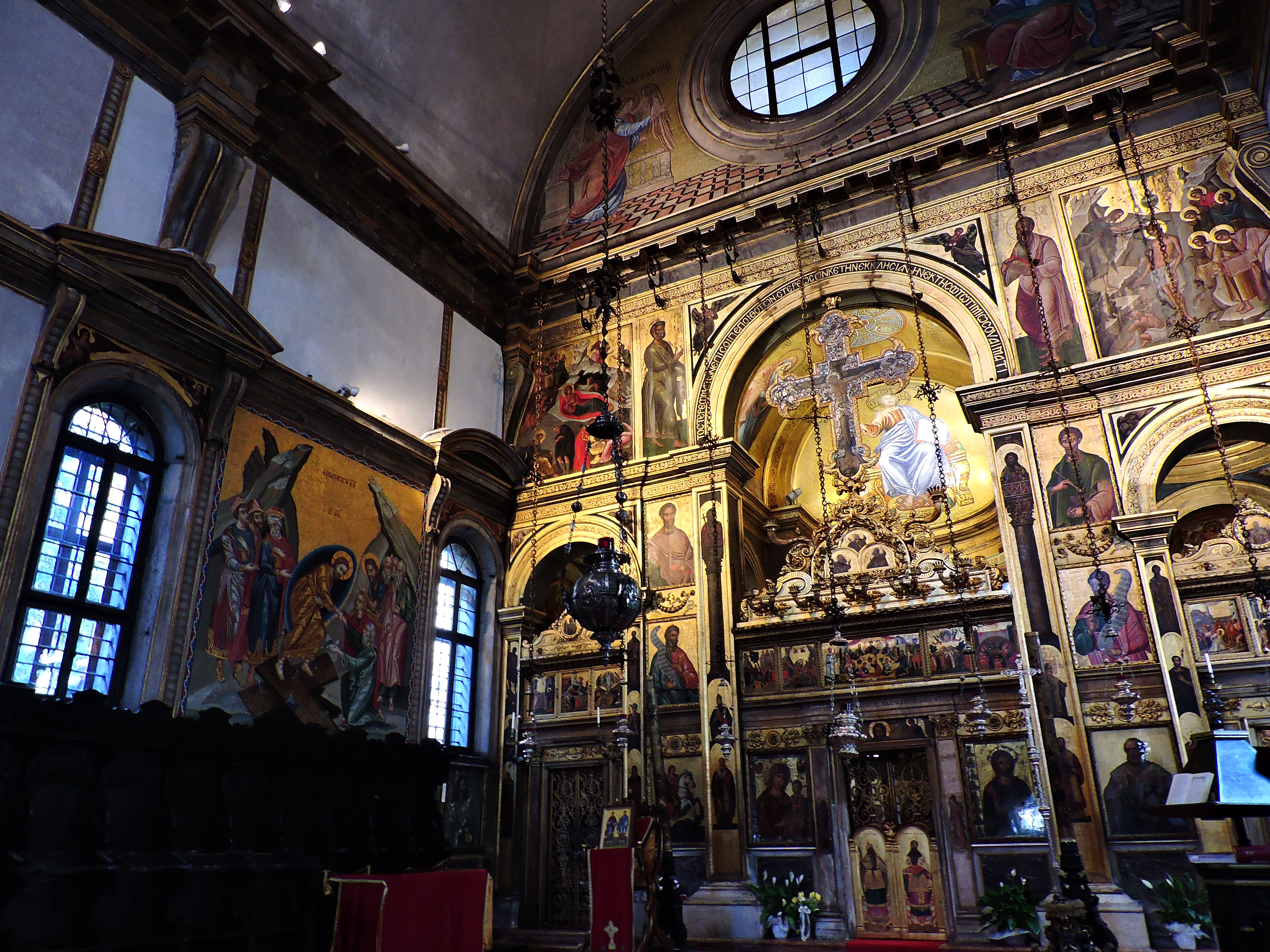
- Harrowing of Hell on the Left Wall was completed by Kyprios
- Born: 16th century Cyprus
- Died: 17th century Venice, Italy
- Known for: Iconography and fresco painting
- Notable work: Dome of San Giorgio dei Greci
- Occupation: Painter
- Years active: 1585–1593
- Era: 16th century
- Style: Maniera Greca

Giovanni Kyprios (Greek: Ιωάννης Κύπριος; 16th century – 17th century), also known as Zuane Ciprioto or Ioannis Kyprios, was a Greek painter from Cyprus living in Venice. Other Greek painters living in Venice around the same period were Thomas Bathas and Emmanuel Tzanfournaris. Kyprios was active during the second part of the 16th century. He was associated with famous painter Tintoretto. Kyprios painted in the traditional Byzantine style. He mixed the traditional Byzantine style with Venetian painting. His work was also influenced by the Cretan artists namely Michael Damaskinos. According to the Institute of Neohellenic Research, eight paintings are attributed to Kyprios. His most notable work is the Dome at San Giorgio dei Greci.

== History ==
Kyprios was born in Cyprus. He migrated to Venice sometime during the middle part of the 16th century. Not much is known about his life. He was associated with the Greek community in Venice towards the end of the 1500s. He was affiliated with the famous Greek church in the region called San Giorgio dei Greci. One of the most famous Greek painters during that time was Michael Damaskinos. He did significant work for the church San Giorgio dei Greci. Damaskinos traveled back to Crete for personal reasons. The committee of the San Giorgio dei Greci invited the famous painter back to Venice to paint the dome of the church but he refused to return due to personal family matters. The committee chose Kyprios to design and paint the dome of the famous church.

According to the minutes of the Greek Community in Venice on March 9, 1589, Kyprios was commissioned to prepare the materials and scaffolding for the decoration of the dome. He prepared the tools for Damaskinos but he never arrived to finish the work. On November 9, 1589, the community decided to allow Kyprios to complete the work. The contract stipulated that famous Italian painter Tintoretto would supervise, consult, and correct the project. Kyprios completed the work within eleven months. On October 4, 1590, Kyprios received 220 ducats. Eight years later Greek painter Thomas Bathas completed a Mosaic of Christ in the niche of the sanctuary of San Giorgio dei Greci.

== See also ==
- Markos Bathas

== Bibliography ==
- Hatzidakis, Manolis (1987). Greek painters after the fall (1450-1830) Volume A. Athens, GR: Center for Modern Greek Studies E.I.E.
- Hatzidakis, Manolis & Drakopoulou, Eugenia (1997). Greek painters after the fall (1450-1830) Volume B. Athens, GR: Center for Modern Greek Studies E.I.E.
- Drakopoulou, Eugenia (2010). Greek painters after the fall (1450-1830) Volume C. Athens, GR: Center for Modern Greek Studies E.I.E.
- Tselenti-Papadopoulou, Niki G. (2002). Οι Εικονες της Ελληνικης Αδελφοτητας της Βενετιας απο το 16ο εως το Πρωτο Μισο του 20ου Αιωνα: Αρχειακη Τεκμηριωση [The Icons of the Greek Brotherhood of Venice from 1600 to First Half of the 20th Century]. Athens: Ministry of Culture Publication of the Archaeological Bulletin No. 81. ISBN 960-214-221-9.
