= Campo Santa Maria Formosa =

Coordinates: 45°26′15″N 12°20′27″E

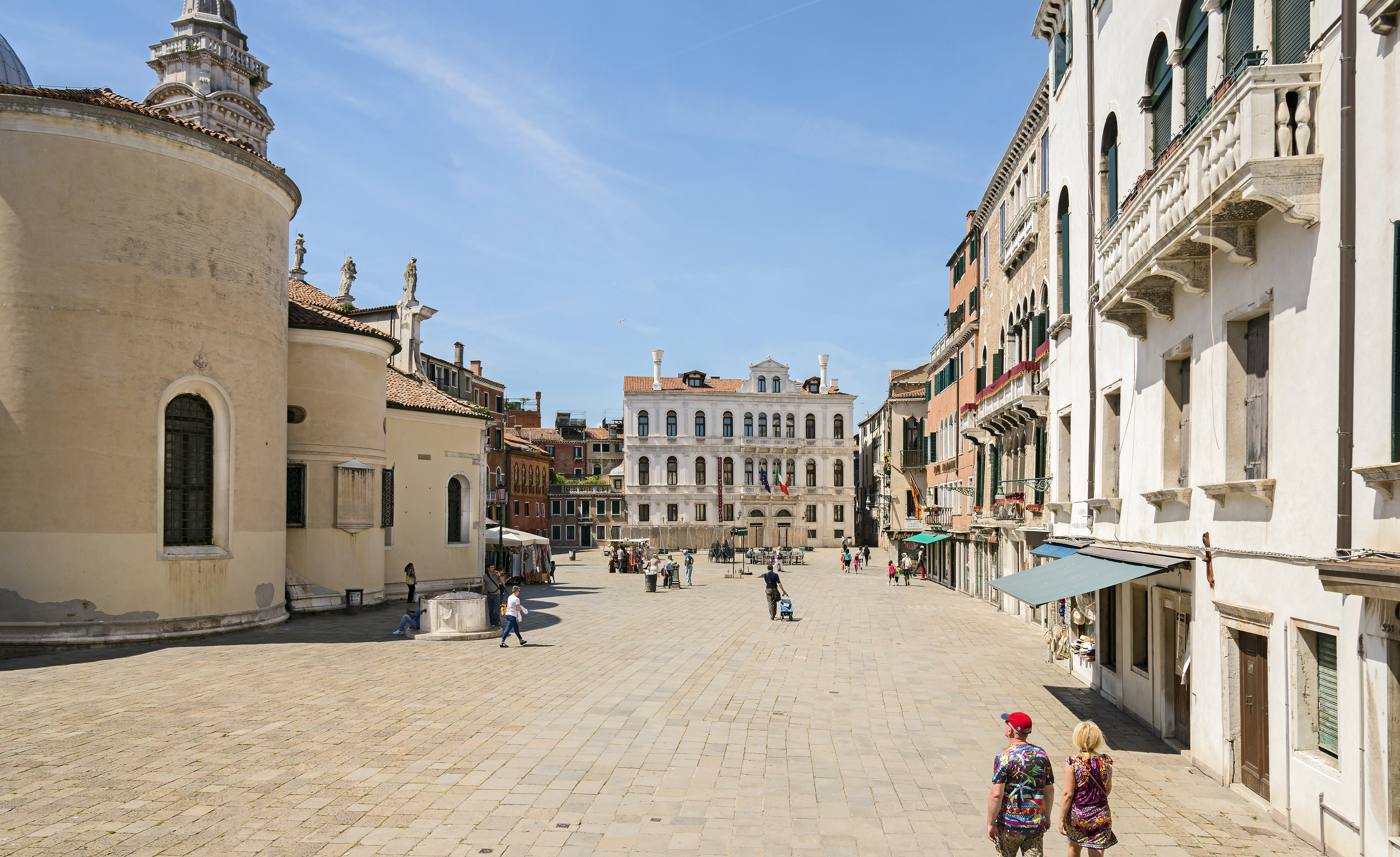
Campo Santa Maria Formosa

Campo Santa Maria Formosa is a city square in the Castello district of Venice, Italy. It was designed by Mauro Codussi in 1492.

== Buildings around the square ==
Some of the notable buildings bordering the square are:

- Chiesa di Santa Maria Formosa
- Palazzo Priuli Ruzzini Loredan
- Palazzo Morosini del Pestrin
- Palazzi Donà
- Casa Venier
- Palazzo Vitturi
- Palazzo Malipiero-Trevisan
- Palazzo Querini Stampalia
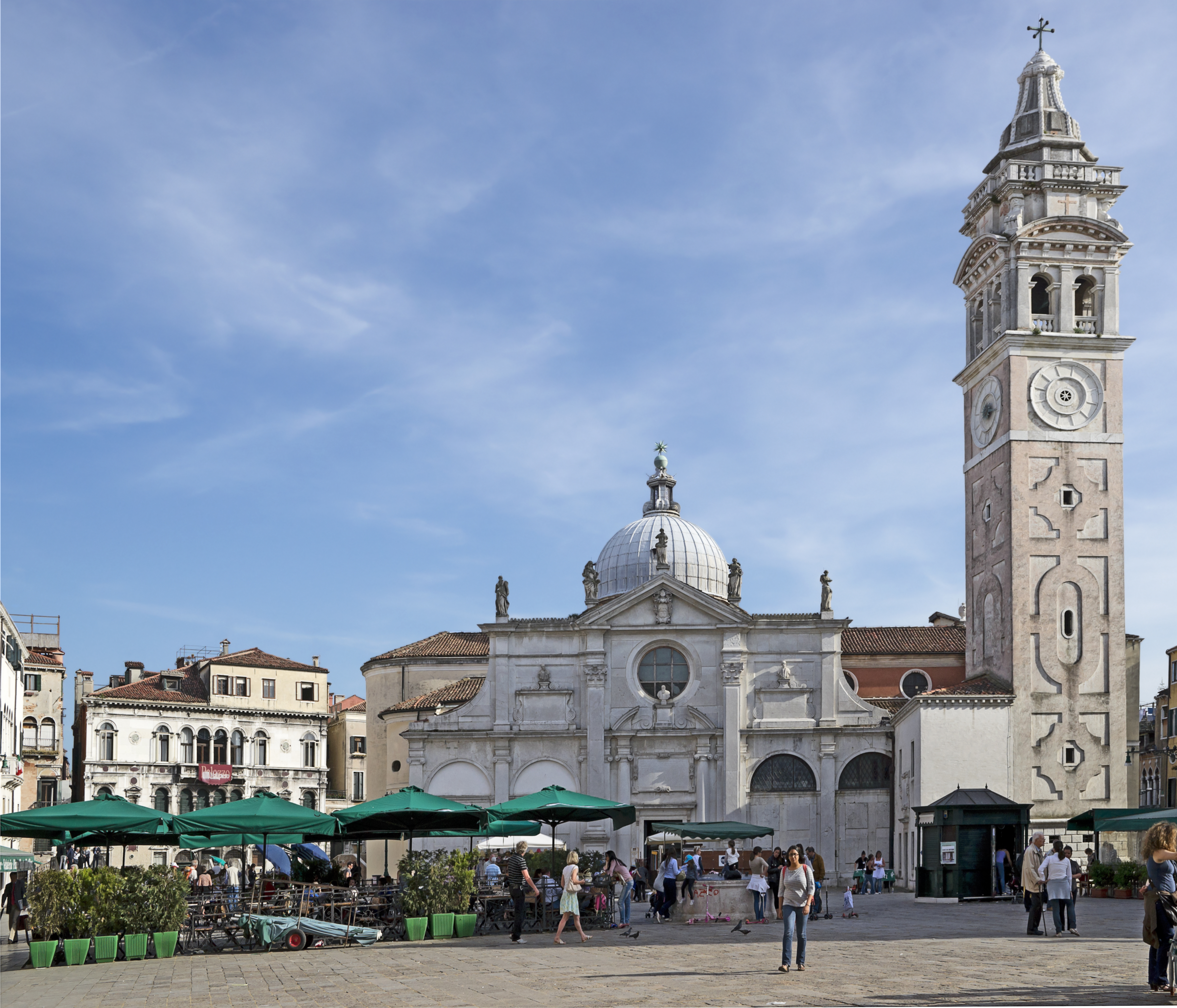
The north facade of Santa Maria Formosa

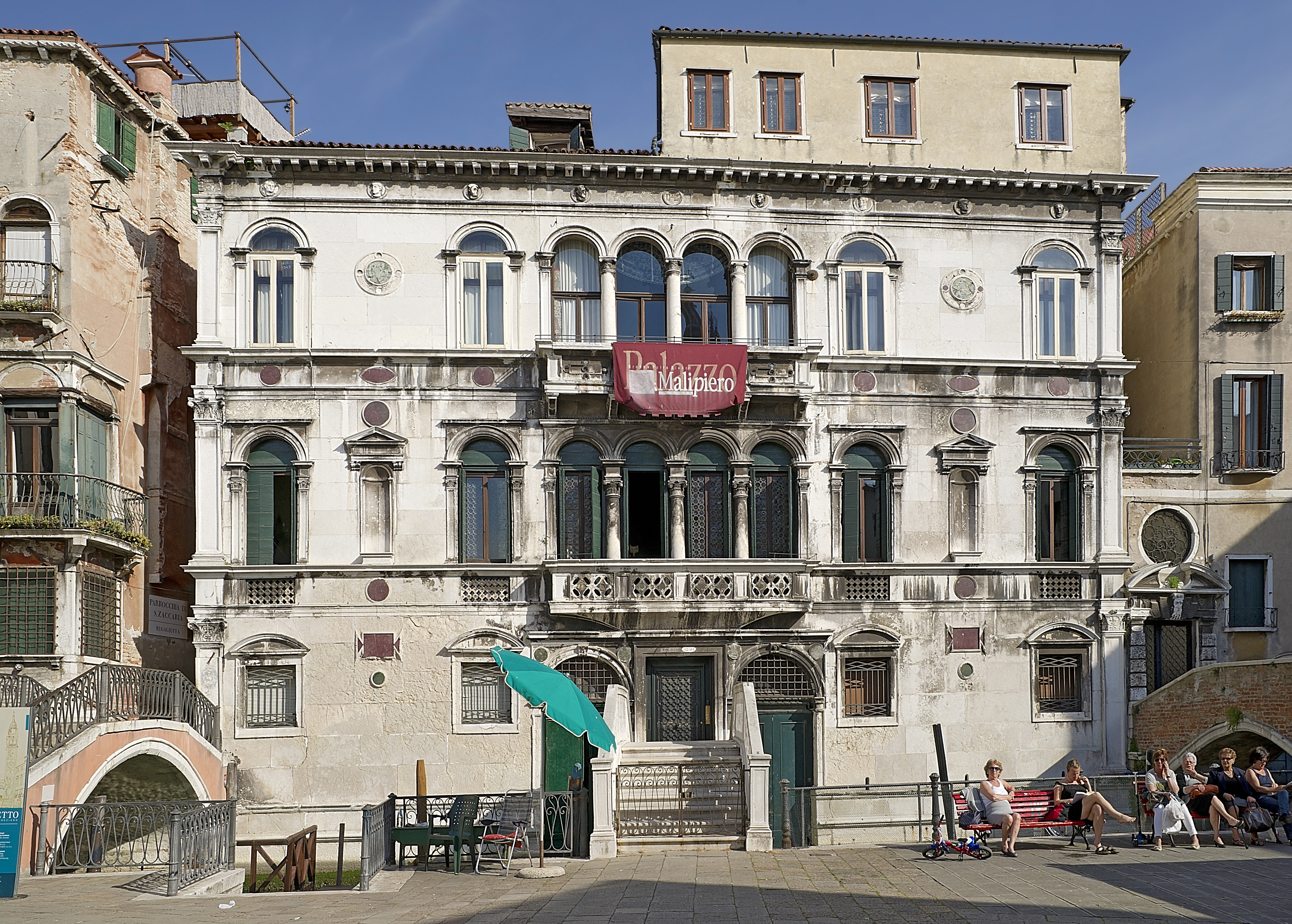
Palazzo Malipiero Trevisan

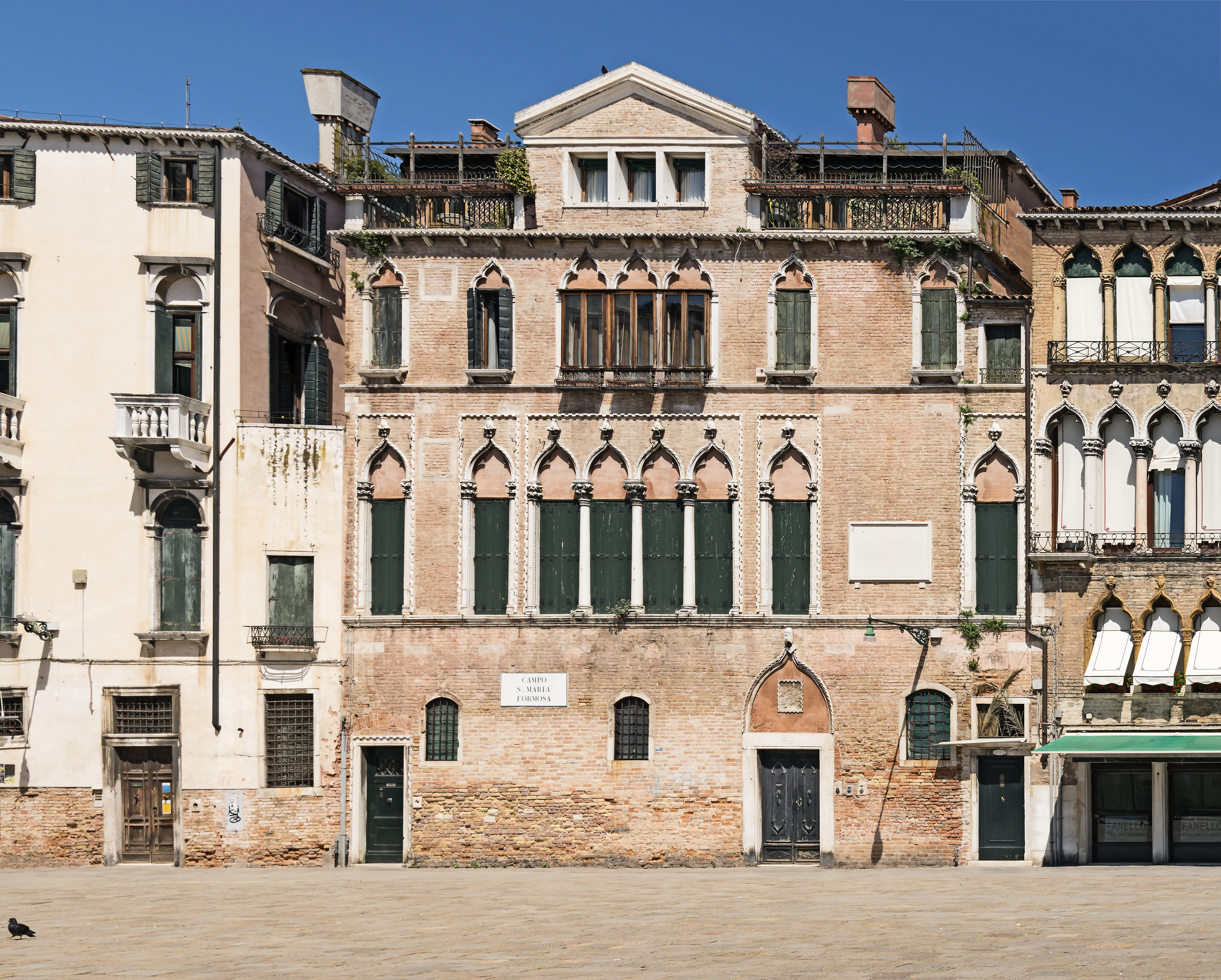
Palazzi Donà - Palazzo central

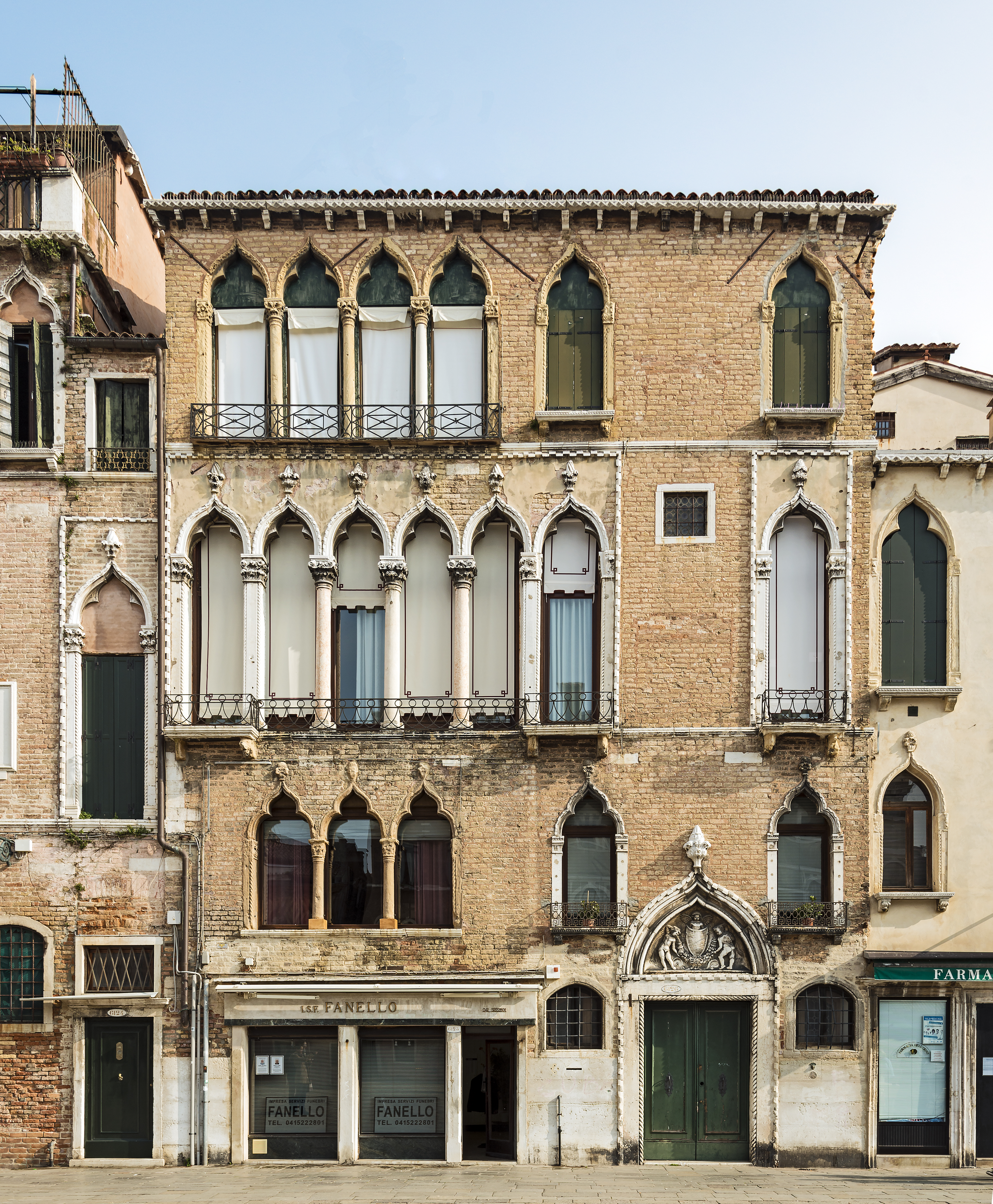
Palazzi Donà - Palazzo right

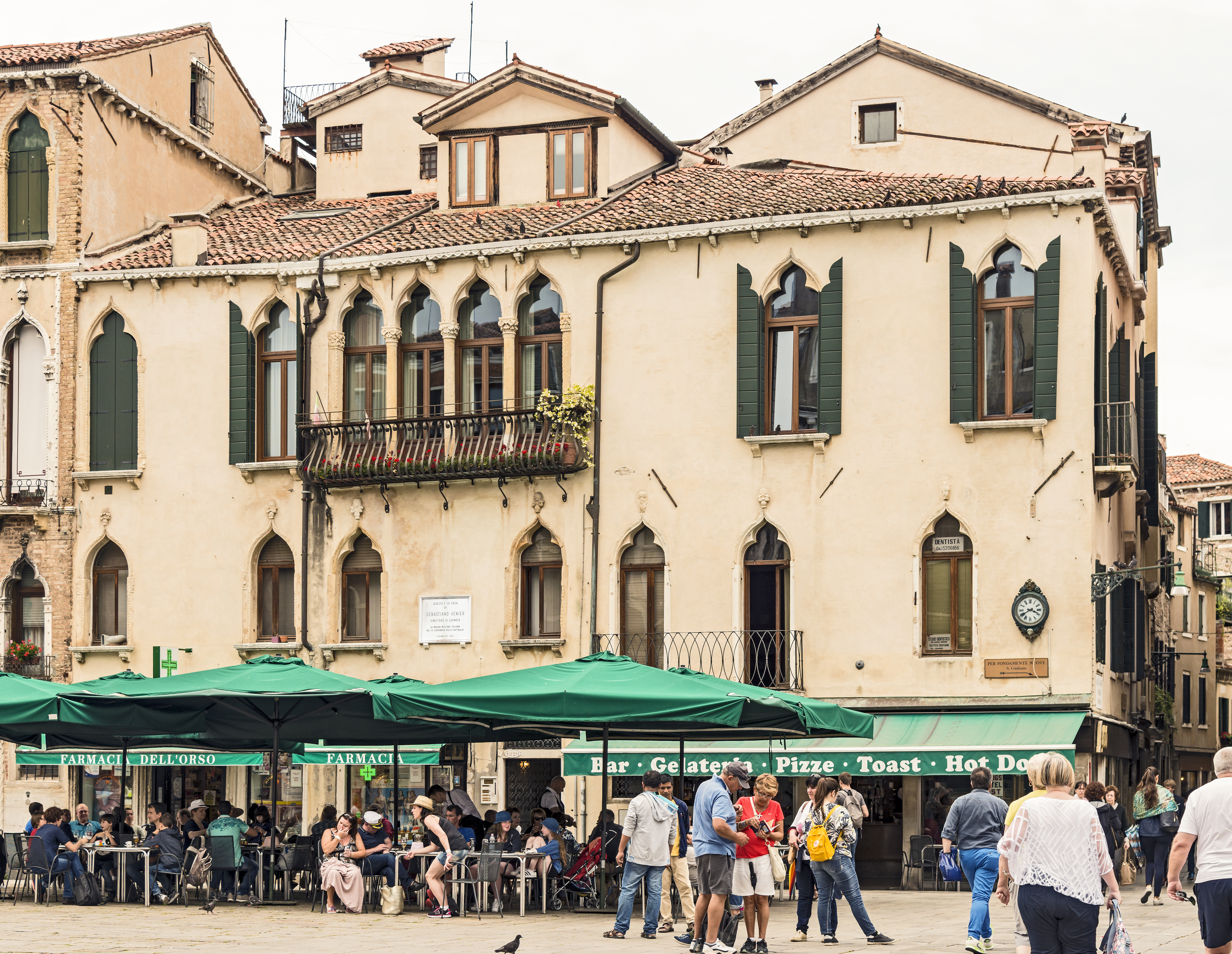
House of Sebastiano Venier
