= Palazzo Vitturi =

Building in Venice, Italy

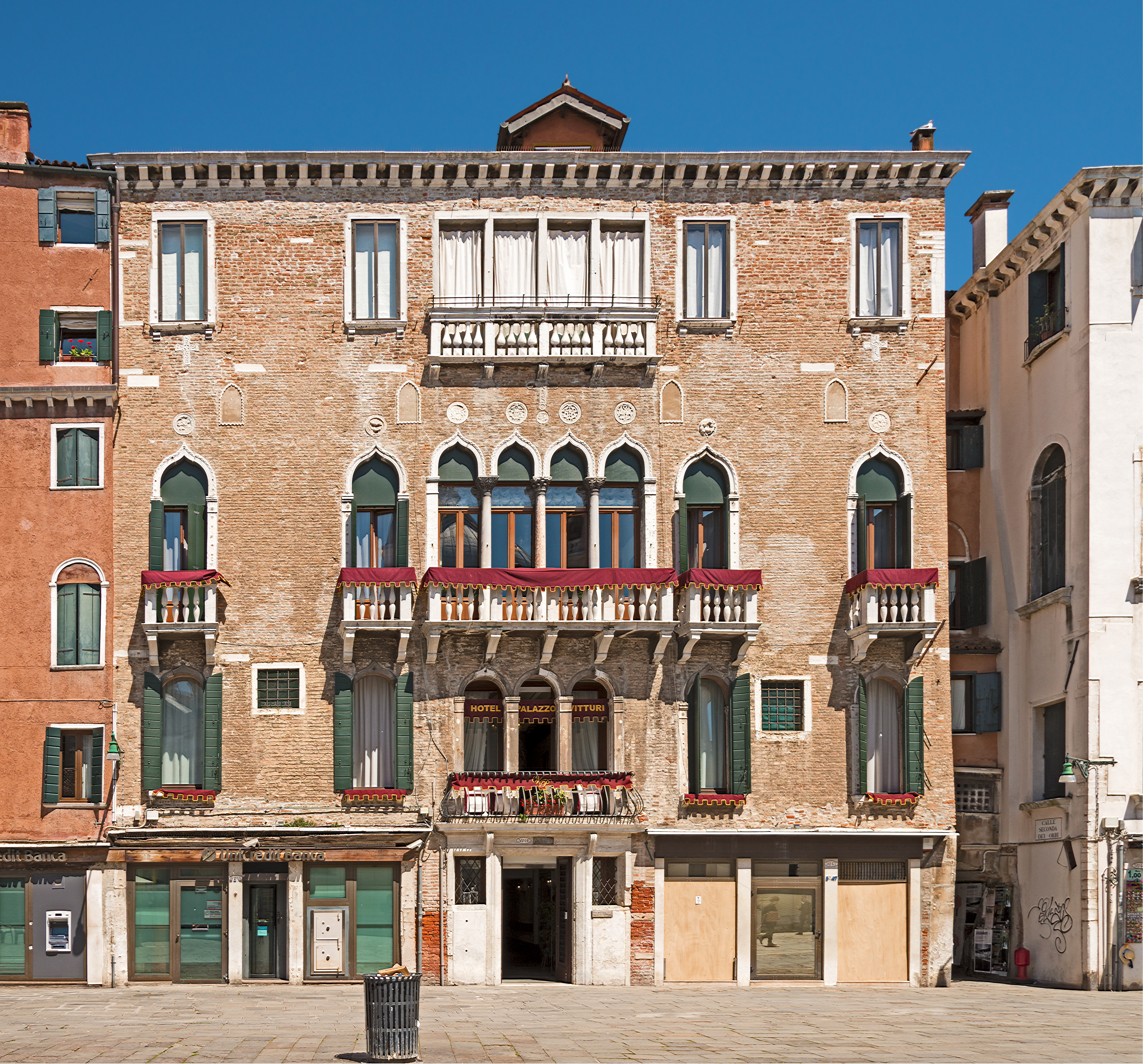
- Palazzo Vitturi
- Interactive map of the Palazzo Vitturi area

General information
- Type: Residential
- Architectural style: Byzantine
- Location: Castello district, Venice, Italy
- Coordinates: 45°26′14.15″N 12°20′29.14″E
- Renovated: 13th century

Technical details
- Floor count: 4 levels

Palazzo Vitturi is a palace in Venice, Italy located in the Castello district, on the north-eastern side of Campo Santa Maria Formosa, of which the palazzo is the oldest building. The palace is mentioned in the works of Sansovino.

== History ==
Palazzo Vitturi is an ancient building: it was built in the second half of the 13th century, and over the centuries it has undergone several renovations that have not compromised its original structure. Today, in a good state of conservation, the building hosts a hotel.

== Architecture ==
The facade of Palazzo Vitturi is of a Venetian-Byzantine style the 14th century and is decorated with Gothic and Moorish motifs. Of special interest are the openings and decorations of the second noble floor: a central quadrifora, flanked by two pairs of monoforas, over which original tiles and paterae are seen. The balustrades were added in later periods (16-17th centuries). There are frescoes inside the main floor.

The mezzanine has a small trifora in the center. The top floor, with its rectangular openings, dates back to the rest of the complex.
