= Mary Magdalene (Tzanes) =

Painting by Konstantinos Tzanes

- Μαρία Μαγδαληνή (Greek), Maria Maddalena (Italian)
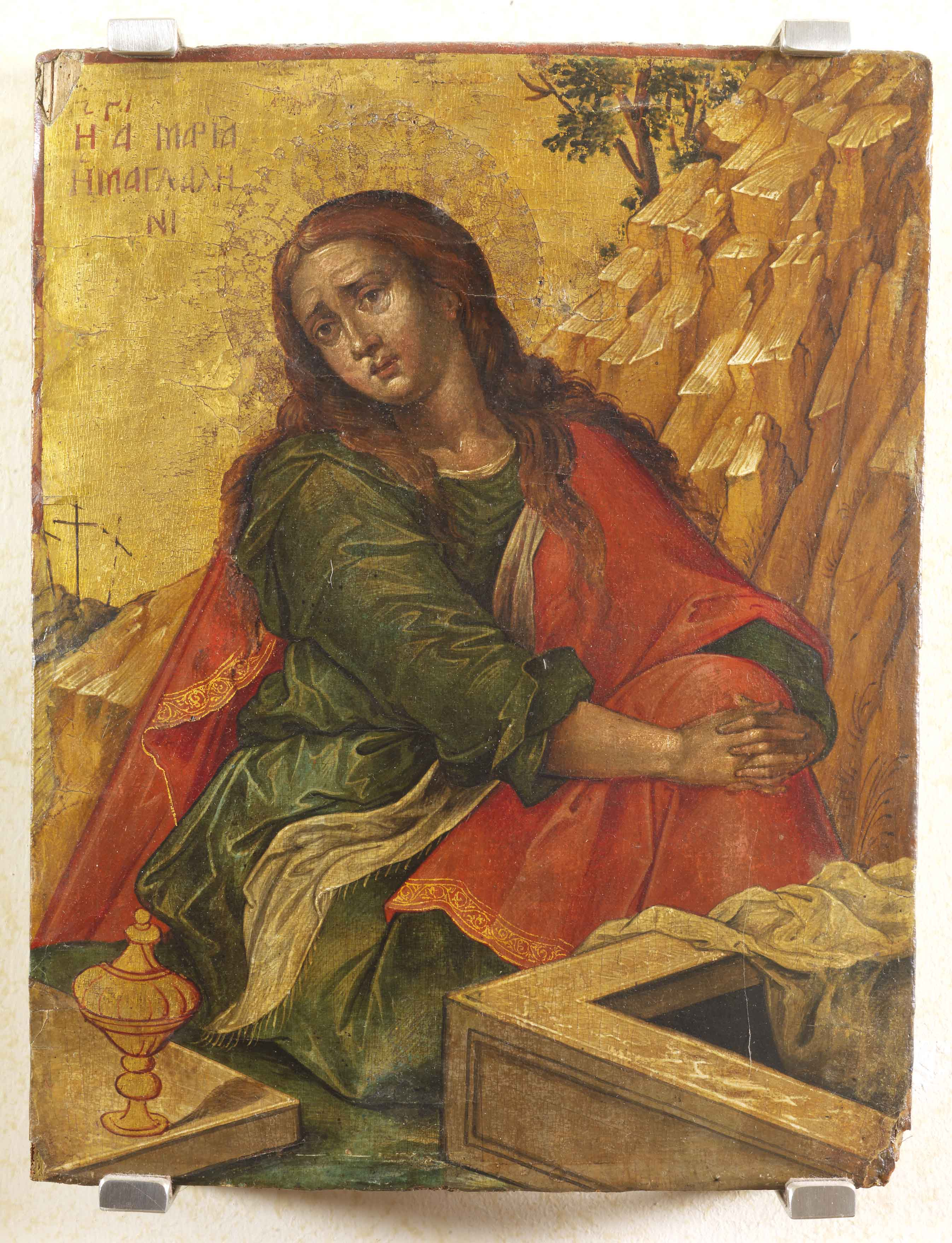
- Artist: Konstantinos Tzanes
- Year: c. 1650–1685
- Medium: tempera on wood
- Movement: Late Cretan School
- Subject: Anointing of Jesus
- Dimensions: 32.5 cm × 26 cm (12.8 in × 10.2 in)
- Location: Hellenic Institute of Venice, Venice, Italy
- Owner: Hellenic Institute of Venice

Mary Magdalene is a tempera painting by Konstantinos Tzanes. Tzanes was a Greek painter active during the late Cretan Renaissance. Tzanes and his brothers migrated from Crete to Venice. His brother was famous painter Emmanuel Tzanes. They were both active during the 17th century. Twenty-one of his paintings survived. Both brothers uniquely contributed to the maniera greca. They made drastic improvements to the style redefining space and color. Their work is comparable to Michael Damaskinos.

Mary Magdalene was a subject painted by countless artists both Greek and Italian. She was a notable figure associated with Jesus and the apostles. Her task was to anoint his body after his death. Famous Venetian painter Titian created multiple paintings of Mary Magdalene. Printmaking became extremely popular since the onset of the printing press in the 15th century. Jan Sadeler I was a Renaissance Flemish engraver. He began his career in Antwerp but finally migrated to Venice with his son and brother. He died in the city in 1600. His engravings inspired countless Greek painters namely Theodore Poulakis, Demetrios Stavrakis and Tzanes. His engraving of Mary Magdalene was the framework for Tzanes's painting. Tzanes stayed loyal to the Greek style but integrated the Flemish prototype. Mary Magdalene is part of the collection of the Hellenic Institute in Venice, Italy.

== Description ==
The materials used for the painting are gold leaf and egg tempera. The height is 32.5 cm (12.8 in) and the width is 26 cm (10.2 in). The Sadeler print was made from a copper engraving. Tzanes adopted some of the components in his painting from Sadeler's work namely the ointment jar and the coffin in the foreground. The facial expression and stance of Mary are also similar to Sadeler's work. Both the Sadeler and Tzanes resemble Titan's work.

Tzanes attempts to create a foreground, a middle ground, and a background. In the foreground, an ointment jar and an empty tomb appear with a holy towel resting on its side. She arrived to anoint his body. The ointment jar contained sacred oils. Diagonal lines on the edges of the surfaces in the foreground clarify the distinction of space.

In the middle ground, a suffering Magdalene weeps the death of her savior. Her facial expression resembles Sadeler's work. Mary’s hands are interlocked over her left knee. Her red hair falls over her shoulders. Mary’s flesh tones and facial features blend adequately delivering the painter's desired result. She is suffering and gazing into space. Her garment features striation folds of fabric, clear lines, groves, and unshapely form. There are also elaborate decorations on her garment. The green blends into the landscape, shadows separate the colors. The painter also uses a distinguishing red color. He employs the cangiante method. The mountain's shape, color, and form are prototypes of the Cretan School. Damaskinos and Tzafouris both use the landscape in their works. It is emblematic of the Cretan style. The trees behind the mountain also define space.

Finally, in the far distant background to the left, the painter adds three crosses. The crosses symbolize the crucifixion and the important role Magdalene played in the series of events. In her scene, she arrives to anoint the body as she promised. The body was not there. Her expression of sorrow is clearly relayed by the painter.

The painting was first documented in 1683, it belonged to a church. The same icon was documented in 1700 and 1742. By 1764, the painting was part of the collection of the Greek Brotherhood of Venice. In 1904, further details were added by historians. They described the work as a painting on wood and noted the painter was Konstantinos Tzanes. In 1949, scholars concluded that his signature was on the back of the icon. The painting was also located in the Scoletta (Flanginian School). The painting finally became part of the official collection of the Hellenic Institute of Venice after the 1950s.

== Gallery ==
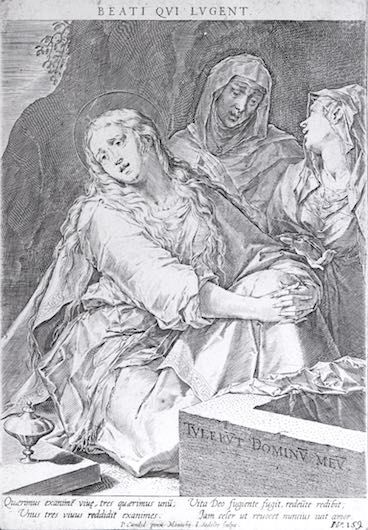
Jan Sadeler Mary Magdalene

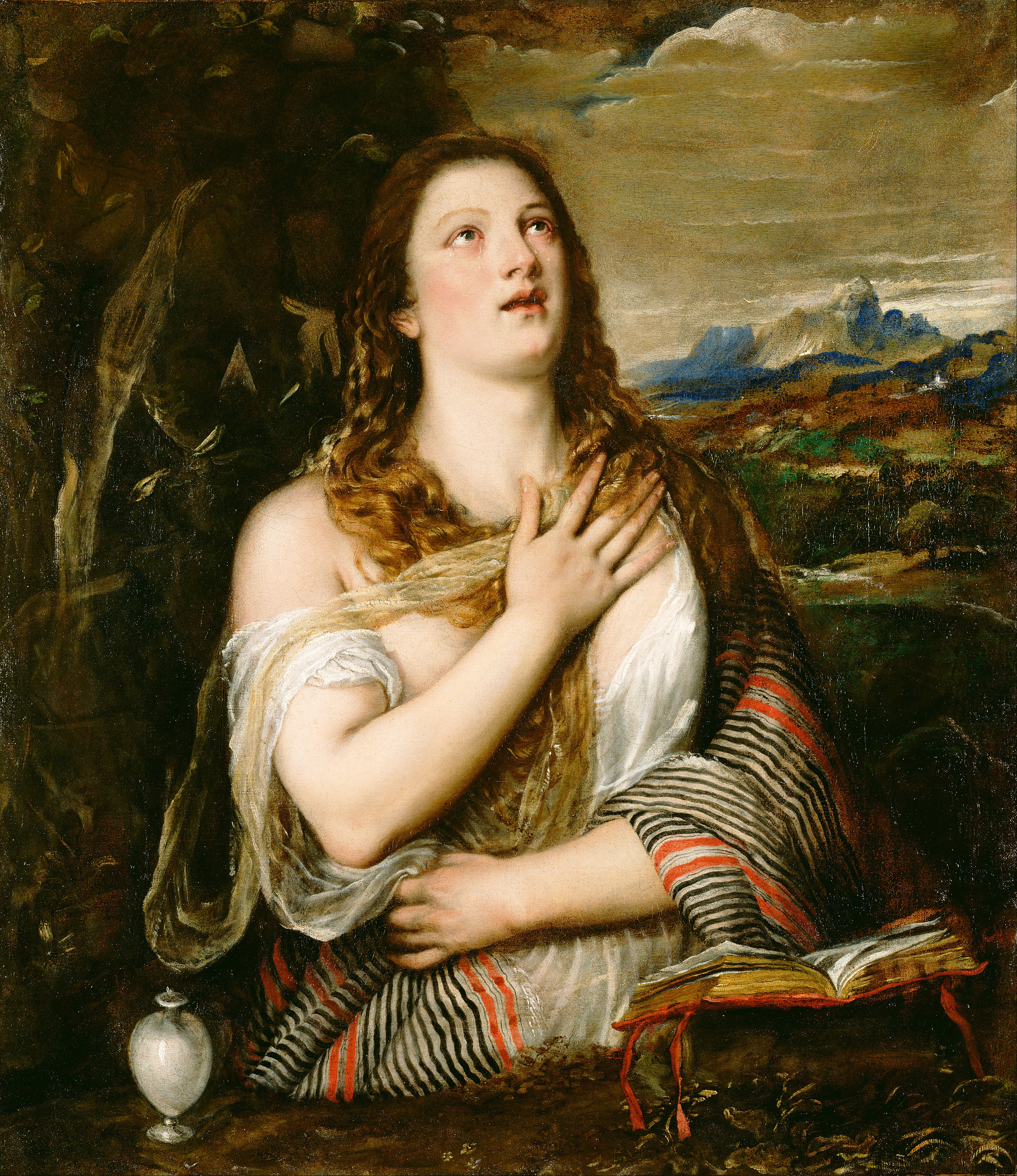
Titian's Magdalene

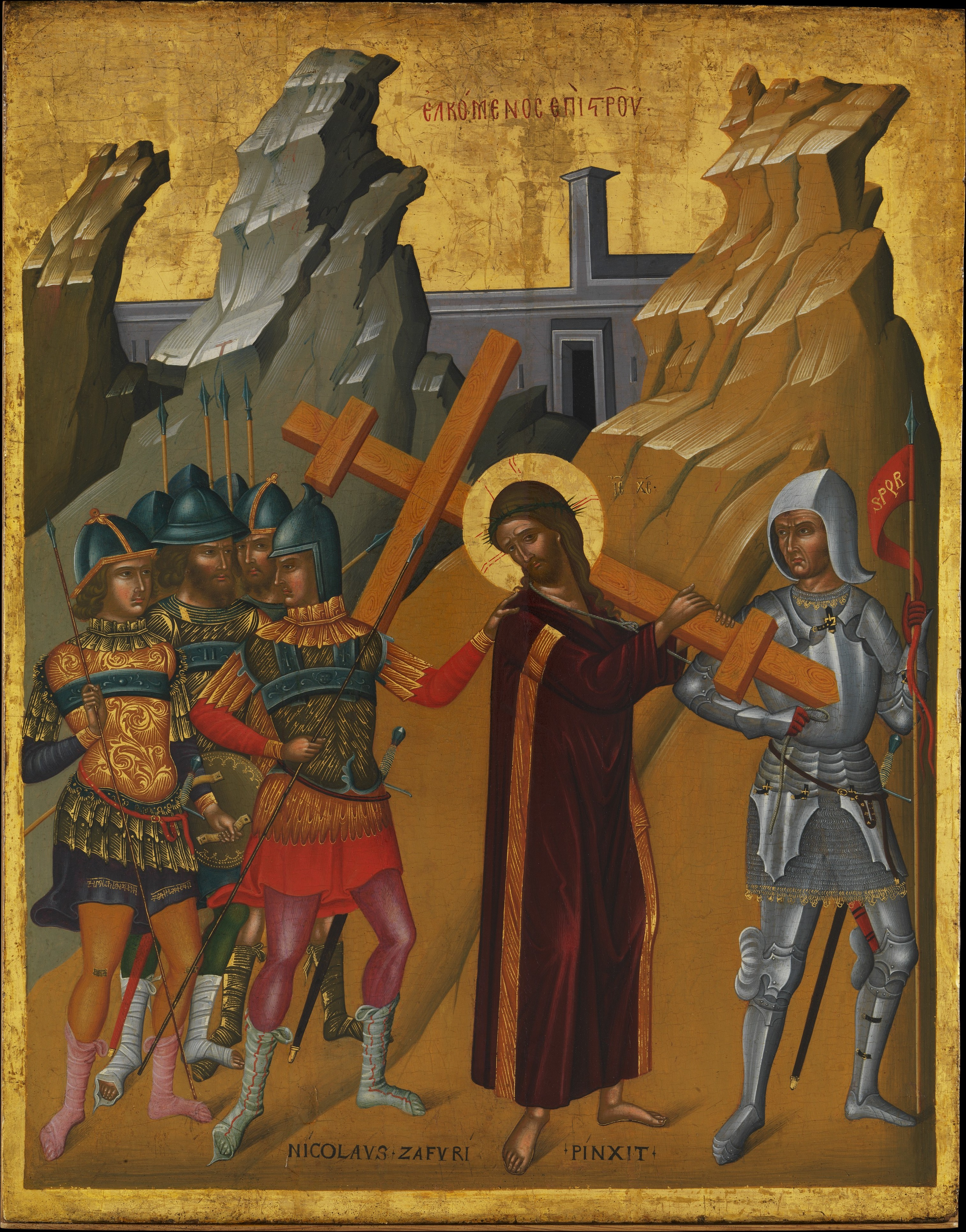
Tzafouris Cretan Mountain
