= Markos Bathas =

Greek painter

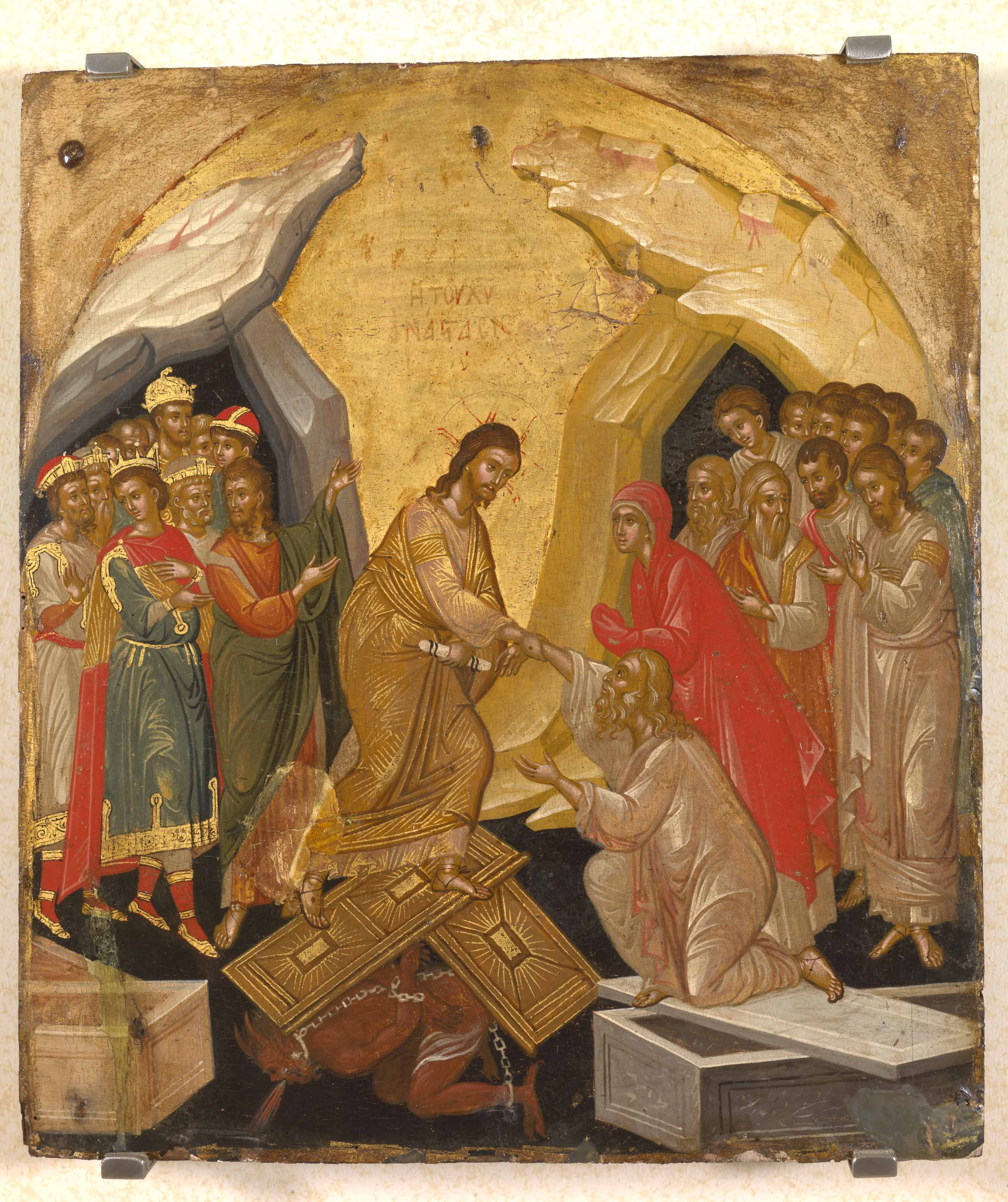
- Harrowing of Hell
- Born: 1498; Heraklion, Republic of Venice
- Died: 1578 (aged 79–80); Venice, Republic of Venice
- Known for: Iconography and hagiography
- Movement: Cretan School

Markos Bathas (Greek: Μάρκος Μπαθάς, 1498 – 1578; also known as Marko Batha) was a painter, copper engraver, and writer. He was a prominent member of the Strelitzas-Bathas family. He may have been related to famous painters Theophanes Bathas and Thomas Bathas. Markos moved to Venice. He was the first Greek painter associated with San Giorgio dei Greci. Greek painter Michael Damaskinos was also in Venice during the 1560s. He follows the traditional maniera greca. He became a prominent member of the Greek community in Venice. Not much of his works survived. His icons can be found in Ioannina. He was an illustrator, he wrote some of the works of Plotinus. He created the works in an Italian-style text. He also created works with mythological themes.

== History ==
Markos was born in Heraklion. He was the son of George. He was probably George Bathas father. He was also probably related to Thomas Bathas and Theophanes Bathas. He was the uncle of Manea and Markou Halkiopoulon. According to documented records, he was a member of the Greek Brotherhood of Venice. His membership began on July 16, 1538, and lasted until 1561. He did work on the church of San Giorgio dei Greci. He was commissioned by the Greek Brotherhood around 1550. He was also living in housing provided by the brotherhood from 1546 to 1552. Court documents indicate he had a financial dispute with the organization.

On February 7, 1560, Markos rented his house in Heraklion to famous painter Manea Halkiopoulo. His name on the document was ό Marcus Strilizza dictus Batta quondam domini Georgii. That same year the artist Manea Halkiopoulo appointed his sister to oversee his estate. She also managed Markos's affairs since he was residing in Venice. Markos was their uncle. In 1563, he was listed in the third register of the Greek Brotherhood. On July 27 of that year, he attempted to be elected as a member of the order. He was unsuccessful. In 1570, his son died in Venice. In the same year, Markos is referenced in a Spanish document. His name was mentioned as: Marco greco, pintor, frontero de la capilla de S. Jorge de los Griegos, gordo i gotosow. Eight years later, according to an obituary by the Greek Brotherhood of Venice. He died on July 28, 1578, the document said: 28 ditto (July 1578) e morto miser Marco Batta, gre co, amallato in anni doi da gotte de anni 80. Licencia tou.

== Notable works ==
=== Icons ===
- Saint John the Baptist w/ Scenes from his Life Metropolios Ioannina Collection
- Christ Enthroned Monastery of John the Baptist Kastritsa, Ioannina
- Virgin Enthroned Monastery of John the Baptist Kastritsa, Ioannina

=== Engravings ===
- Self Portrait of Marafara Skordili 1563 British Museum

=== Illustrations ===
- Vind. Phil. Gr. 182, (Plotinus writings and Self Portrait) Austrian National Library
- Vind. Theol. Gr. 7, (writings with images of Genesis) Austrian National Library
- Vind. Hist. Gr. 117, (writings with mythological images Austrian National Library

== Bibliography ==
- Hatzidakis, Manolis (1987). Greek painters after the fall (1450-1830) Volume A. Center for Modern Greek Studies E.I.E.
- Hatzidakis, Manolis & Drakopoulou, Eugenia (1997). Greek painters after the fall (1450-1830) Volume B. Center for Modern Greek Studies E.I.E.
- Drakopoulou, Eugenia (2010). Greek painters after the fall (1450-1830) Volume C. Center for Modern Greek Studies E.I.E.
