= Konstantinos Tzanes =

Greek painter

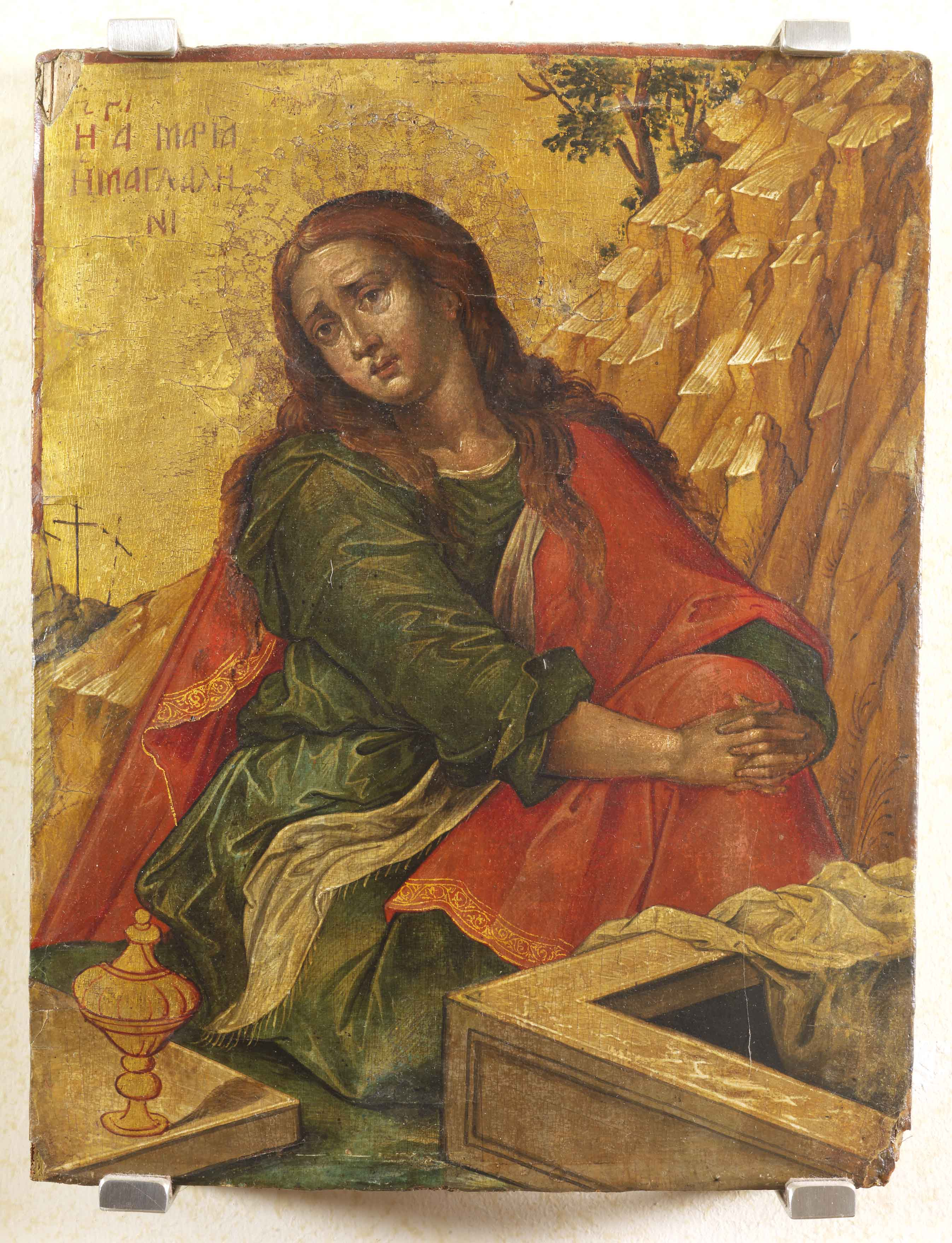
- Mary Magdalene
- Born: 1633; Rethymno, Republic of Venice
- Died: 1685 (aged 51–52); Venice, Republic of Venice
- Known for: Painter
- Movement: Cretan School
- Spouse: Kali
- Children: Emmanuel; George; Antonia

Konstantinos Tzanes (Greek: Κωνσταντίνος Τζάνες, 1633 – 1685; also known as Bounialis (Greek: Μπουνιαλής) Konstantinos Tzane-Bounialis, Konstantinos Zane, or Konstantinos Tzane) was a Greek Renaissance painter. He was a painter in Crete and Venice. His brother Emmanuel Tzanes was the parish priest of the church of San Giorgio dei Greci. Emmanuel Tzanes was also a famous painter and author. Konstantinos followed the Venetian style and in some instances completely broke from the maniera greca. His other brother Marinos Tzanes was a famous poet. Konstantinos's work influenced both Greek and Italian Painters. His most popular work is the painting by Mary Magdalene which is at the Greek Institute in Venice.

== History ==
Tzanes was born in Rethymno. His older brothers were both artists. His one brother was the painter Emmanuel Tzanes. His other brother was the poet Marinos Tzanes. Konstantinos migrated to Venice with his brother around 1655. Around this period Greek painters Ioannis Moskos and Leos Moskos were also present in Venice. Konstantinos married Kalitsa or Kali. They had three children Emmanuel, George, and Antonia. His children were baptized by the painter and priest Philotheos Skoufos at San Giorgio dei Greci. According to the church records of Saint Antonios Parish, his wife died on March 7, 1663. She was forty years old.

Konstantinos paid for the publication of the Sequence of Saint Joseph. It was written by his brother Emmanuel. The two brothers continued to flourish in Venice. Emmanuel Tzanes replaced Philotheos Skoufos as the priest of San Giorgio dei Greci. Philotheos Skoufos returned to Zakynthos in 1665, the Venetian State granted him the monastery of Panagia Laurentaina. Konstantinos died around 1685. Emmanuel Tzanes was the presiding priest at the wedding of Konstantinos's daughter Antonia in 1685. She was Emmanuel's niece. She was married at San Giorgio dei Greci.

Konstantinos Tzanes's artwork was very popular. Emmanuel Tzanes and his brother Konstantinos had a very good reputation. A huge catalog still exists representing both brothers. They are both considered members of the Cretan Renaissance and both were influenced by the Venetian style. Gregory Maras a prominent priest from Crete donated one of Konstantinos's works to San Giorgio dei Greci. Konstantinos's art can be found all over the world in private collections, museums, and churches. There are 21 existing paintings attributed to Tzanes.

== Gallery ==
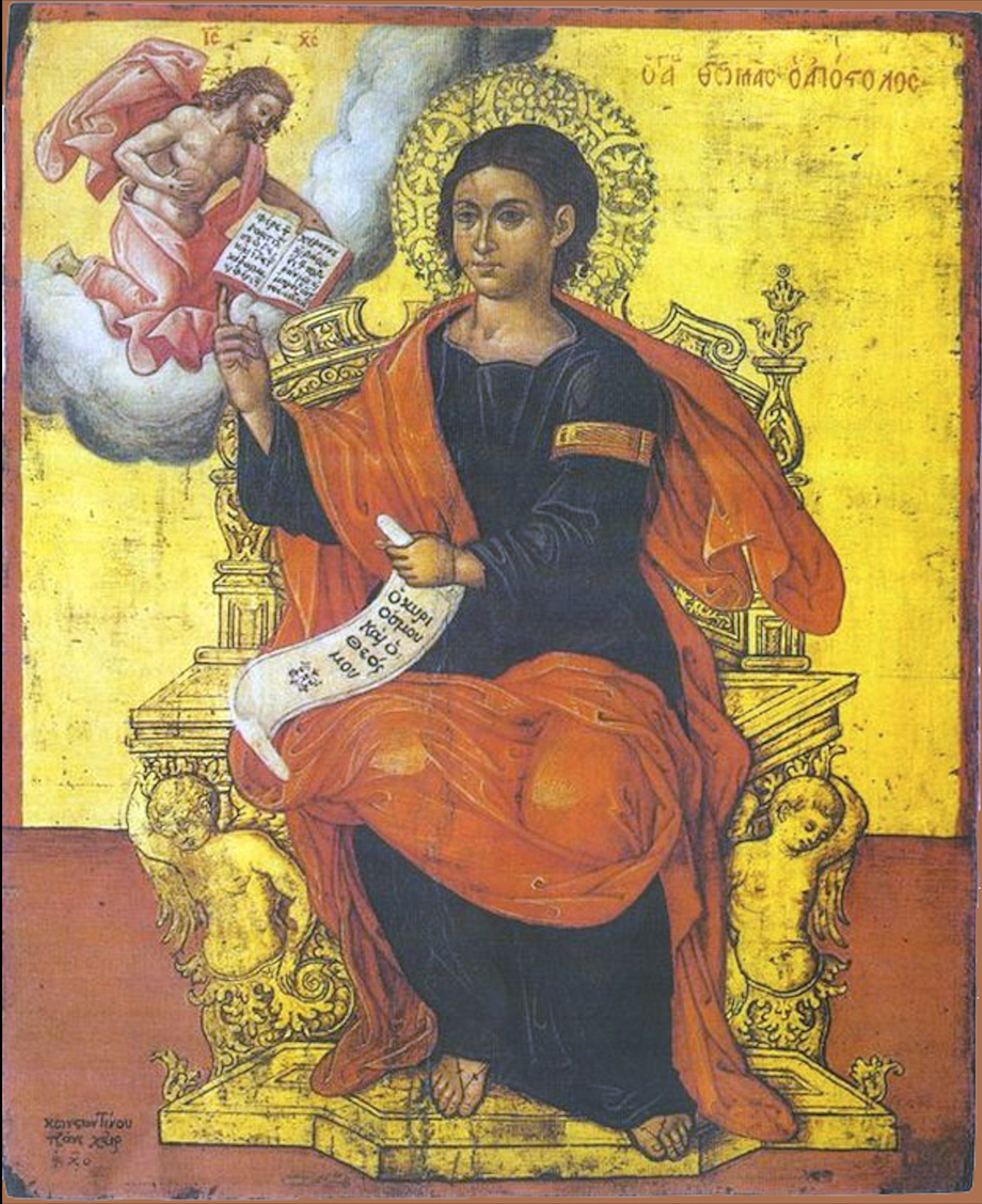
Saint Thomas

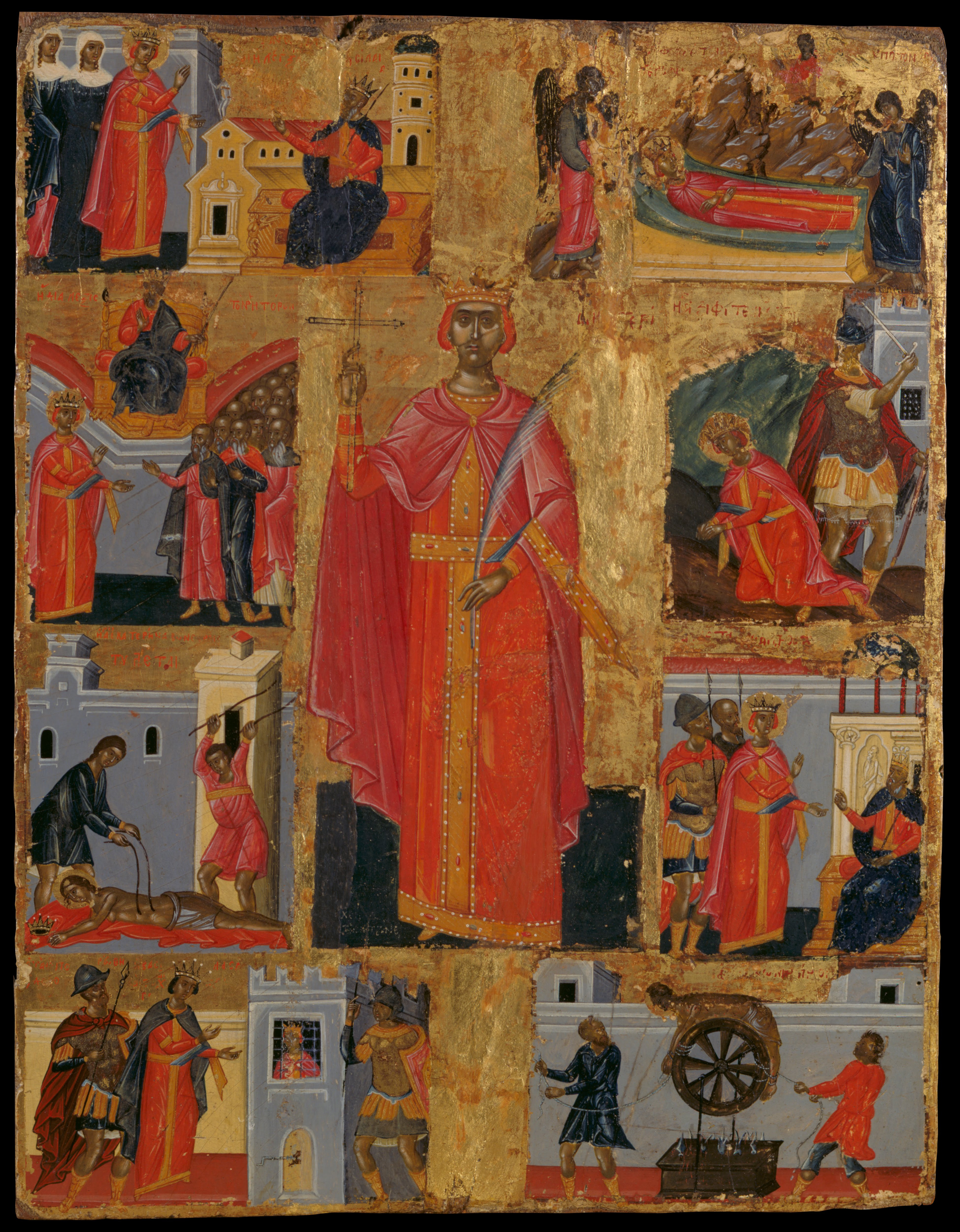
Portrait of Jesus

== Notable works ==
- Saints of the 22nd of January Greek Institute in Venice
- St Catherine and eight representations of scenes from her life and martyrdom Benaki Museum Athina
- The Virgin Vrefokratousa enthroned Cathedral of Saint James and Saint Christopher, Corfu, Greece
- Mary Magdalene (Tzanes)

== Bibliography ==
- Tselenti-Papadopoulou, Niki G. (2002). Οι Εικονες της Ελληνικης Αδελφοτητας της Βενετιας απο το 16ο εως το Πρωτο Μισο του 20ου Αιωνα: Αρχειακη Τεκμηριωση [The Icons of the Greek Brotherhood of Venice from 1600 to First Half of the 20th Century]. Athens: Ministry of Culture Publication of the Archaeological Bulletin No. 81. ISBN 960-214-221-9.
- Hatzidakis, Manolis; Drakopoulou, Evgenia (1997). Έλληνες Ζωγράφοι μετά την Άλωση (1450-1830). Τόμος 2: Καβαλλάρος - Ψαθόπουλος [Greek Painters after the Fall of Constantinople (1450-1830). Volume 2: Kavallaros - Psathopoulos]. Athens: Center for Modern Greek Studies, National Research Foundation. hdl:10442/14088. ISBN 960-7916-00-X.
