= Castello, Venice =

Quarter of Venice

Coordinates: 45°26′08.52″N 12°20′54.60″E

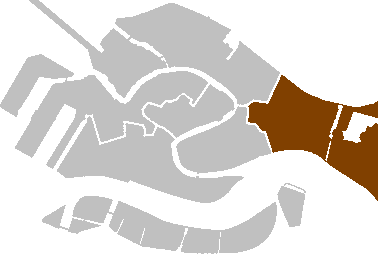
Castello shown within Venice.

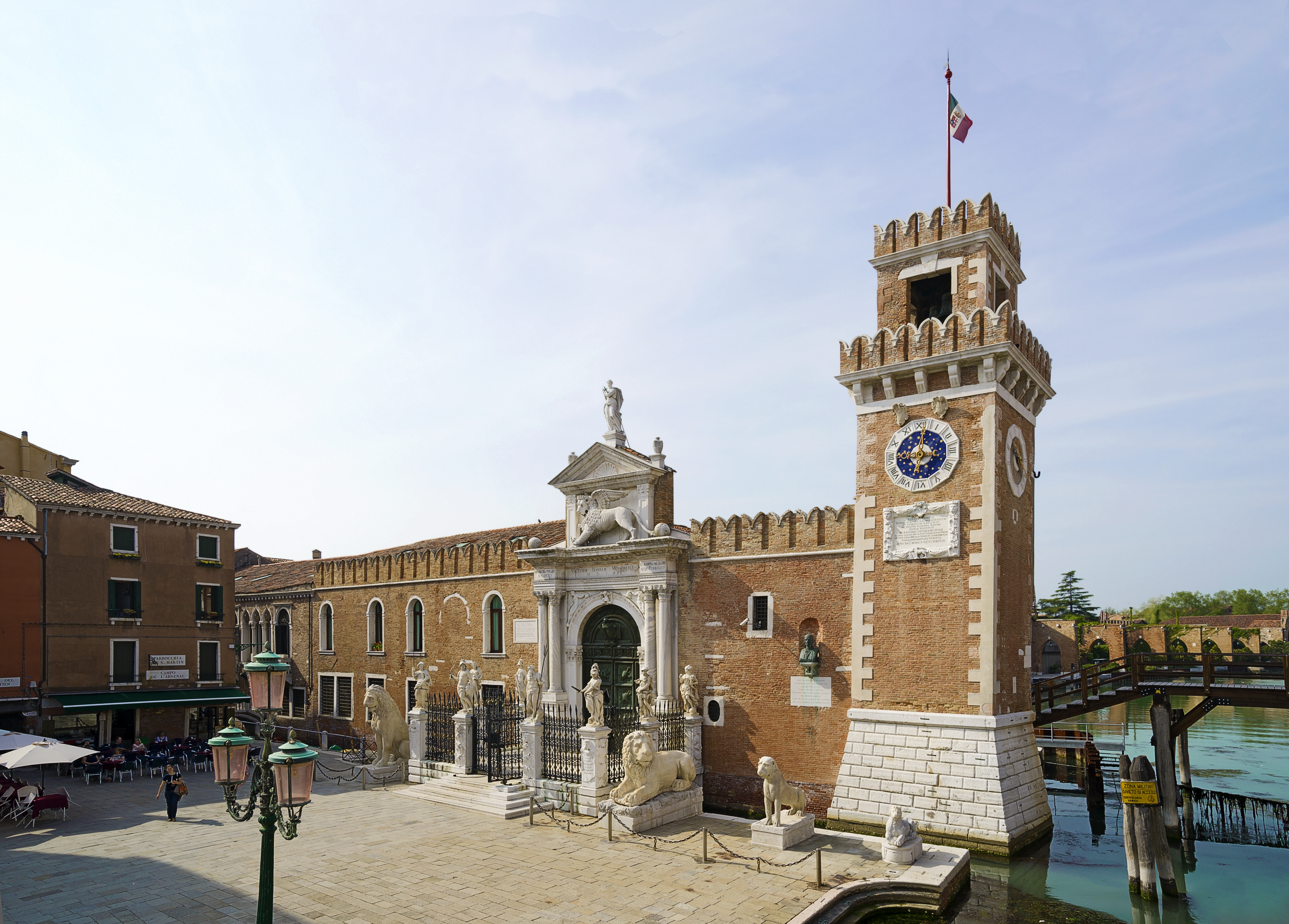
Campo de l'Arsenal

Castello is the largest of the six sestieri of Venice, Italy.

== History ==
There had been, since at least the 8th-century, small settlements of the islands of San Pietro di Castello (for which the sestiere is named). This island was also called Isola d'Olivolo.

From the thirteenth century onward, the district grew around a naval dockyard on what was originally the Isole Gemini (Corresponding to San Lorenzo and San Martino). The land in the district was dominated by the Arsenale of the Republic of Venice, then the largest naval complex in Europe. A Greek mercantile community numbering around 5,000 in the Renaissance and late Middle Ages was based in this district, with the Flanginian School and the Greek Orthodox Church of San Giorgio dei Greci being located here, of which the former comprises the Hellenic Institute of Byzantine and Post-Byzantine Studies in Venice and the latter is now the seat of the Greek Orthodox Archdiocese of Italy.

Other significant structures were by the monasteries in the north of the quarter.

Napoleon closed the Arsenal and planned what are now the Bienniale Gardens. More recently the island of Sant'Elena has been created, and more land drained at other extremities of Castello.

== Landmarks ==
Prominent sites and buildings in Castello include:

- Church of Santi Giovanni e Paolo (San Zanipoli)
- Church of San Giorgio dei Greci
- Campo Santa Maria Formosa and Church of Santa Maria Formosa
- Church and Ospedale della Pietà
- Church of San Zaccaria
- Church of San Giovanni di Malta
- Scuola of San Giorgio degli Schiavoni
- Scuola di San Marco
- Venetian Arsenal
- Church of Sant'Elena
- Palazzo Malipiero-Trevisan
- Palazzo Vitturi
- Palazzo Zorzi Bon

== See also ==
- Sestieri of Venice
