= De Waard =

De Waard is a Dutch occupational surname meaning "the innkeeper" or "landlord". Variant (archaic) spellings are De Waardt, De Waart, De Weerd, De Weerdt and De Weert. Notable people with the surname include:

De Waard

- Cornelis de Waard (1879–1963), Dutch historian
- Dirk de Waard (1919–2011), Dutch-born American geologist
- Elly de Waard (born 1940), Dutch poet
- Maaike de Waard (born 1996), Dutch swimmer
- Orin de Waard (born 1983), Curaçao footballer
- Raymond de Waard (born 1973), Dutch footballer
- Steven de Waard (born 1991), Australian tennis player
- Sytse Klaas de Waard (1796–1856), Dutch Mennonite teacher and minister
- Xan de Waard (born 1995), Dutch field hockey player

De Waart

- Edo de Waart (born 1941), Dutch conductor
- Paula de Waart (1876–1938), Dutch film actress

De Weerdt

- Adriaen de Weerdt (c.1510–c.1590), Flemish painter

De Weert

- Anna De Weert (1867–1950), Belgian painter
- Kevin De Weert (born 1982), Belgian racing cyclist
- Sebald de Weert (1567–1603), Dutch admiral and explorer
