= Jacob Grimmer =

Flemish painter

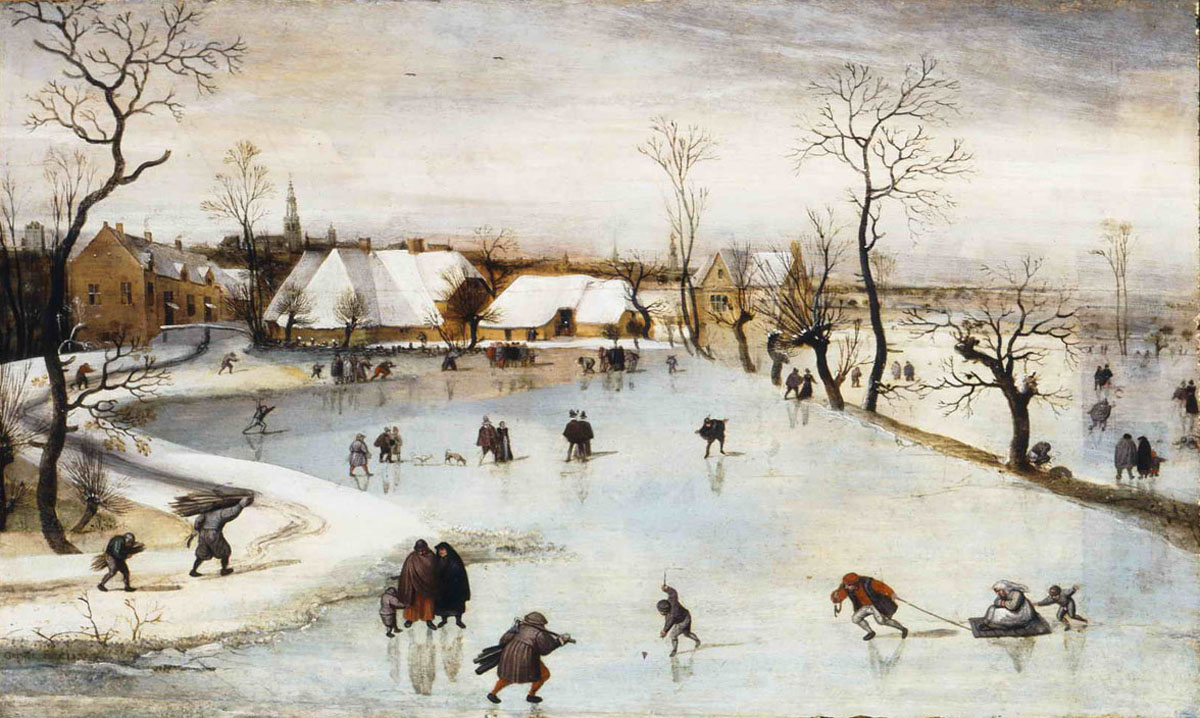
Winter

Jacob Grimmer (c. 1526 – before May 1590) was a Flemish landscape painter and draughtsman. His rural scenes and landscapes of views around Antwerp marked an important development in 16th century Flemish landscape painting away from the world landscape with its fantastic panoramas and whimsically shaped gigantic rocks towards greater simplicity and authenticity. His work influenced the next generation of Flemish landscape painters. Grimmer was a capable colorist who was able to create harmonic landscapes by using realistic colours and atmospheric values effectively.

== Life ==
Jacob Grimmer was born in Antwerp as the son of the small merchant Nicolaas and Elisabeth Cops. According to the early Flemish biographer Karel van Mander, Grimmer first learned to paint landscapes from Matthys Cock and later from Christian van den Queborn, both of Antwerp. There are no written sources, which confirm these apprenticeships.

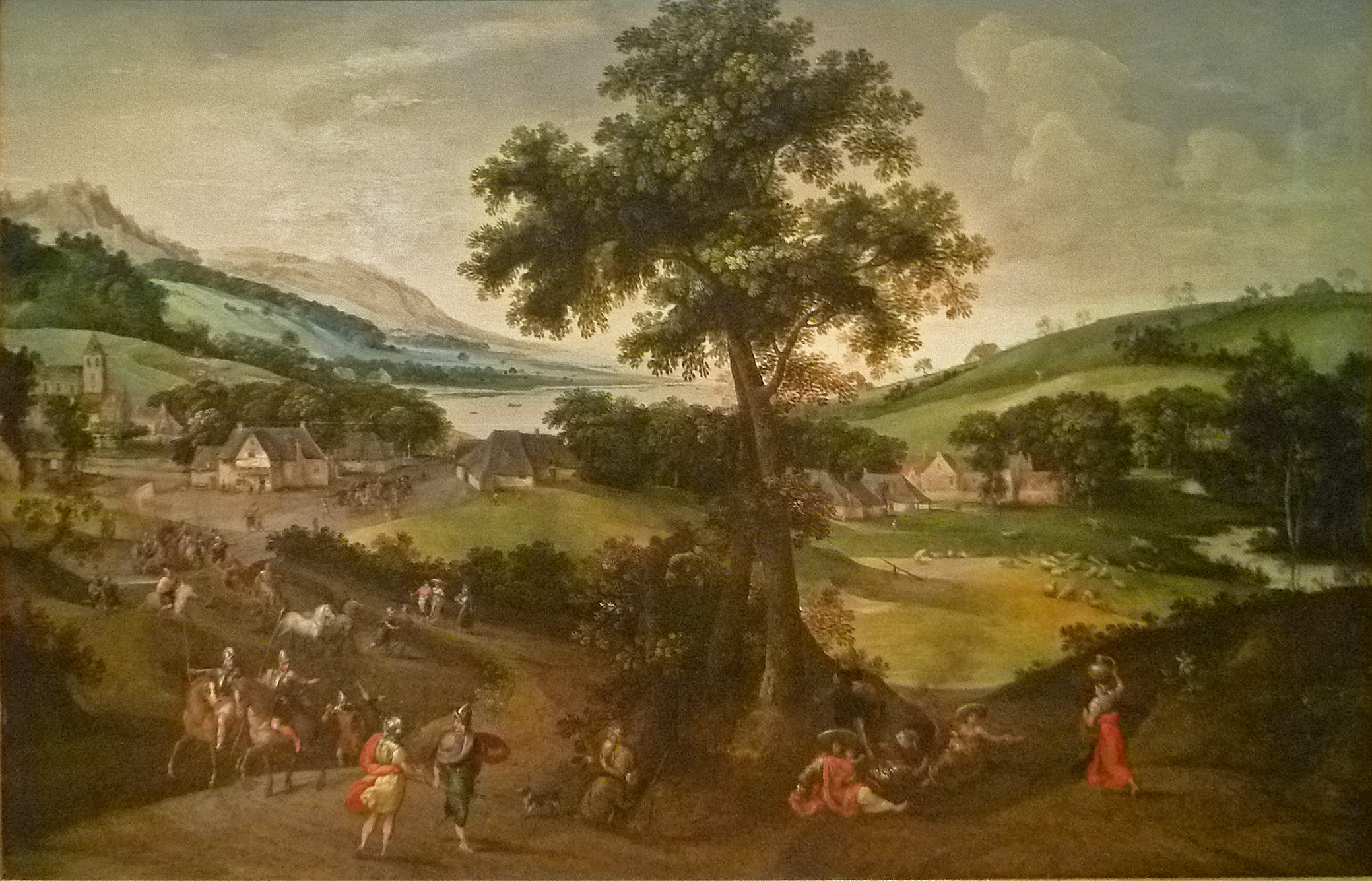
Landscape with figures

The only documentary evidence relating to Grimmer's training is his registration in 1539 under the name Iaques Grimmaer in the liggeren of the Antwerp Guild of Saint Luke as a student of Gabriel Bouwens. It is therefore not certain that Grimmer in fact was a pupil of Matthys Cock and Christian van den Queborn. Grimmer became a master in the Antwerp Guild of Saint Luke in 1547.

Grimmer married Lucia van de Wouwer in April 1548. Of the four children born out of this marriage Abel became an important landscape and architectural painter. There is some disagreement among art historians as to whether or not Grimmer traveled to Italy as many of his artist contemporaries did. He bought a house in the centre of Antwerp where he set up his studio. He was known for painting after nature in the areas around Antwerp.

As early as 1550 Jacob Grimmer was praised by the famous Italian art historian Vasari as one of the best landscape painters of his time. Karel van Mander described Grimmer as 'such an outstanding landscape painter that in some respects I do not know a better one, so lively and lovely were his skies'. Grimmer's art was appreciated not only by his contemporaries but also by artists of the next century. Both Pieter Lastman and his famous pupil, Rembrandt, owned landscapes by Grimmer. Rembrandt's inventory of 1656 included a winter landscape by Jacob Grimmer.

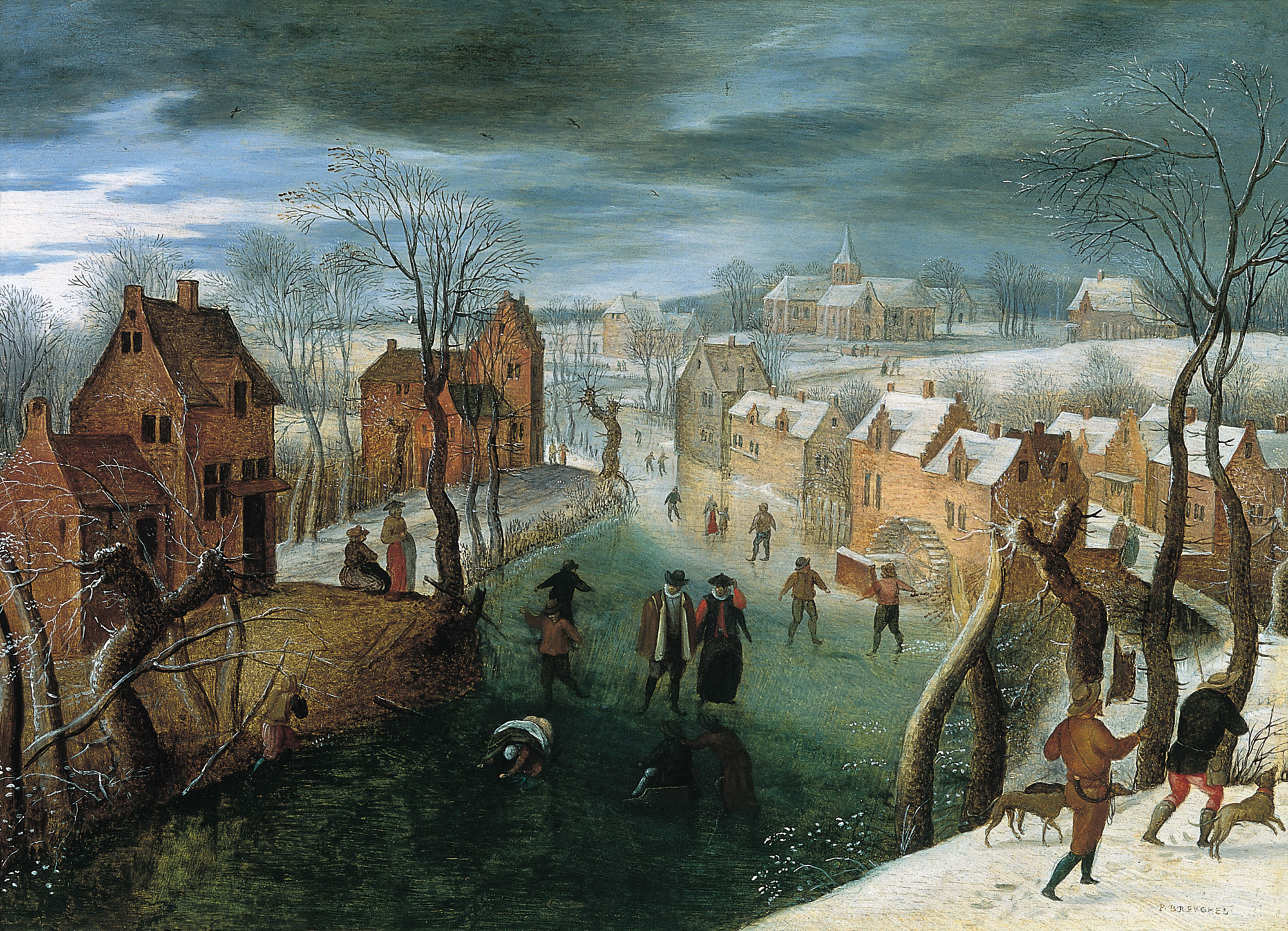
A winter landscape with a village, skaters on a frozen river, and hunters in the foreground

Jacob Grimmer was an active member of the local chamber of rhetoric Violieren where he was celebrated as a poet and author of comic writings. He died before May 1590 in Antwerp.

== Work ==
=== General ===
Jacob Grimmer was principally a painter of landscapes and winter scenes although he also painted some religiously themed works such as the Tower of Babel and genre works. He often returned to the subject of the Four Seasons and the Twelve Months.

His earliest dated work was dated to 1546 and his latest dated work to 1589. He was known for working directly from nature as was reported by Karel van Mander.

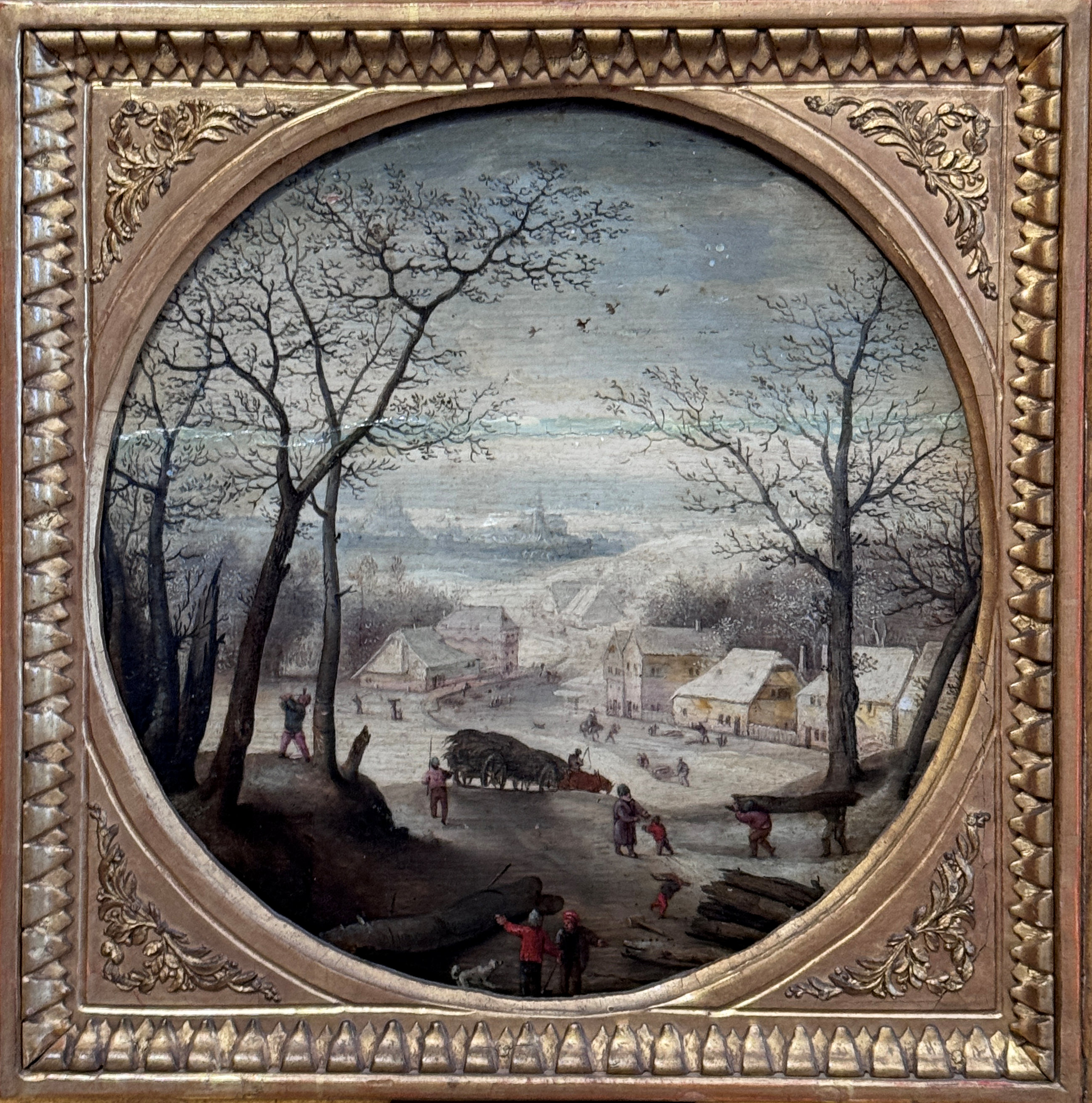
Winter landscape (Dessau)

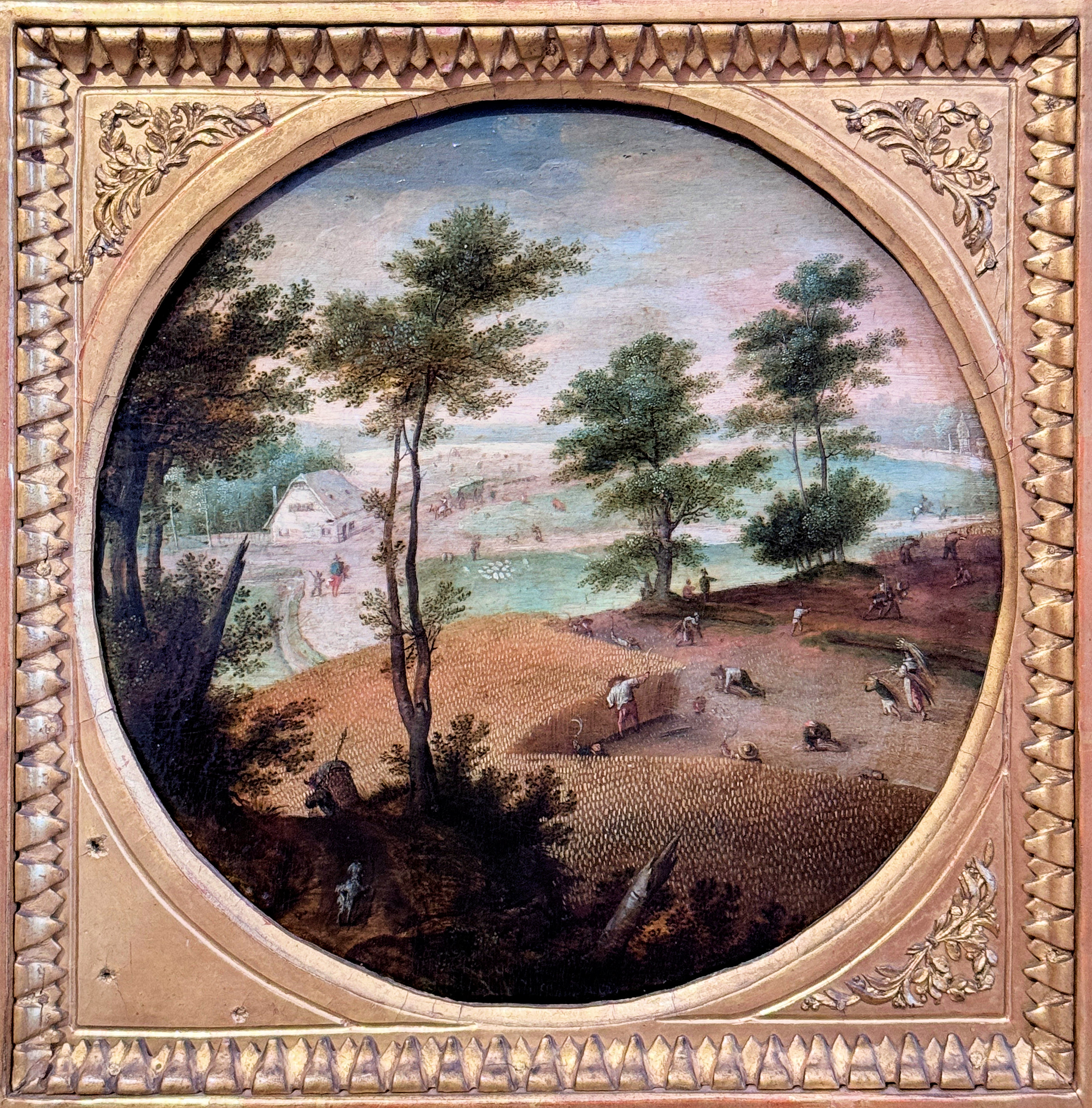
Summer landscape (Dessau)

His output was large as he relied on a large workshop, which produced small-scale panels in a standardized production process. His son Abel further streamlined this mass production process.

=== Significance of his work ===
Jacob has often been regarded as an imitator of Pieter Brueghel the Elder who recreated Brueghel's artistic innovations on small panels and supplied these to the market at low prices. Grimmer's landscapes did at the same time constitute a further development in the landscape genre. Grimmer broke away from the earlier Flemish tradition of the so-called 'world landscape' initiated by Joachim Patinir. The term world landscape is used in art historical literature for a landscape composition, which shows an imaginary panoramic landscape with mountains and lowlands, water, and buildings from an elevated viewpoint and usually includes a small-scale Biblical or historical narrative but the figures comprising this narrative element are dwarfed by their surroundings.

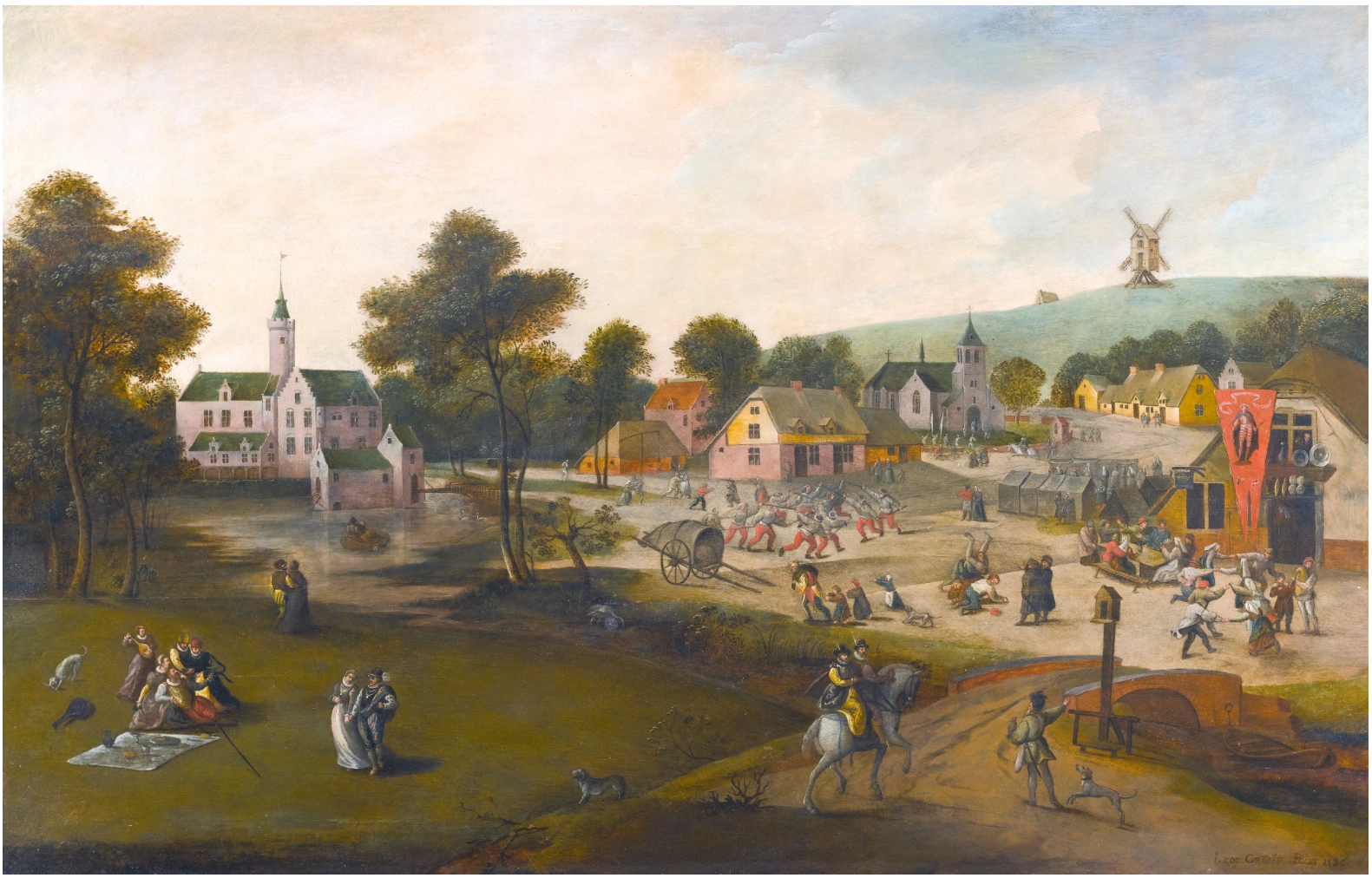
Entrance to a village with peasants carousing

In his earliest landscape drawing of a View over a tree-covered hill towards a village on a river (1573, Kunsthalle Hamburg) and in the series of paintings of the Four Seasons (1577, Museum of Fine Arts (Budapest) Jacob Grimmer showed a preference for depicting realistic flat Flemish landscapes with villages and farmhouses and populated with rural residents. The small figures in these scenes are set in graduated zones of recession along rolling hills towards a horizon in the middle of the panel. These landscapes with figures and small anecdotal scenes are rendered in a naturalist manner. Grimmer abandoned the contrived world landscape of the earlier generation in favour of a simplicity and authenticity never seen before.

His landscapes develop the scenery continuously from the foreground to the horizon. His compositions are broken up in large zones of uniform colour that contrast with each other. He chose more realistic colours than those used in the world landscapes of his predecessors. He used well-constructed, atmospheric values in order to arrive at a unity of composition. He had his own style of representing trees, which rise thinly against the background with spare crowns of foliage and each leaf drawn individually.

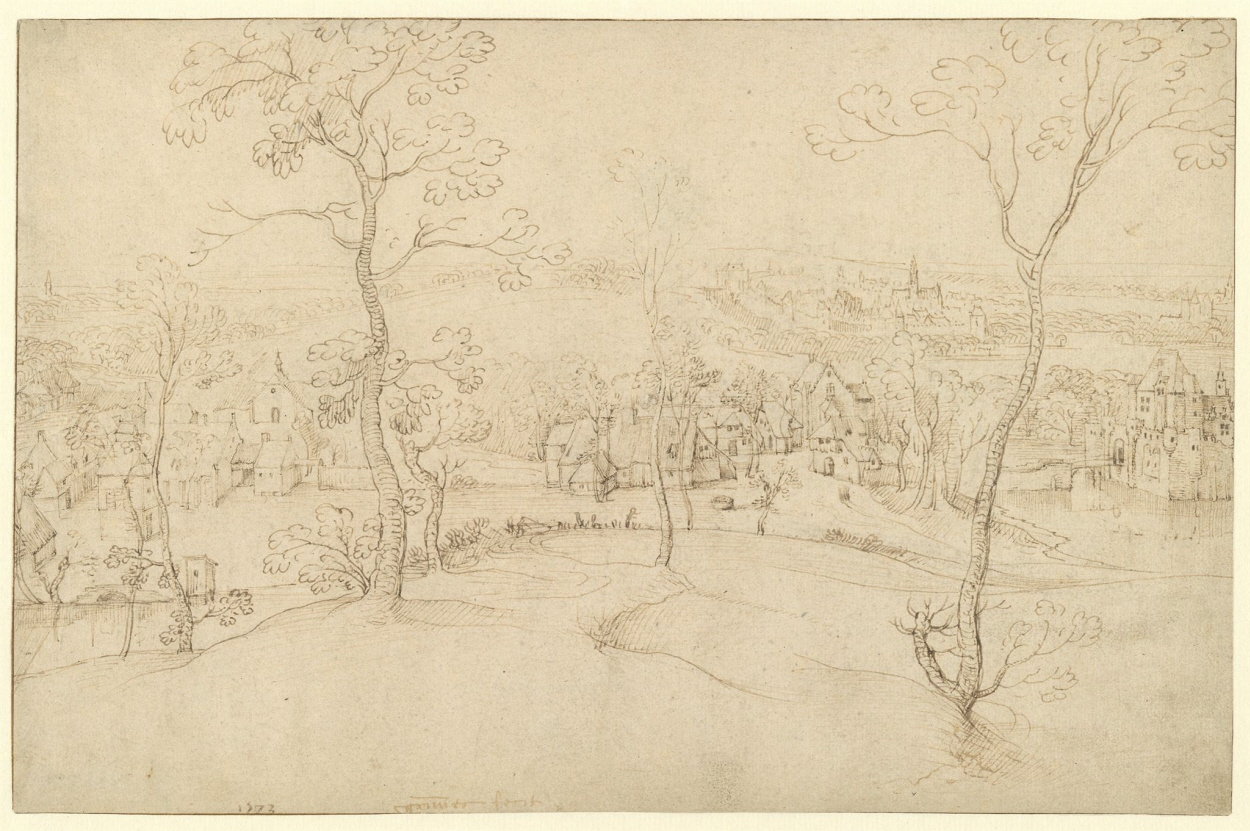
View over a tree-covered hill towards a village on a river

Grimmer's work stands out in its ability to provide a simple and sincere view of everyday life. In this attention for rural life Grimmer's work shows a parallel with the landscapes ascribed to the Master of the Small Landscapes which were first published around 1560 and signaled a move away from the world landscape with its religious scenes towards an engagement with the real life in the countryside. Unlike Pieter Brueghel the Elder who had a grim view of peasants, Grimmer held a much sunnier view of peasant life than did his fellow painter. Grimmer often accentuated the lighter, humoristic side of rural life as seen in his A Winter Landscape with a Village, Skaters on a Frozen River, and Hunters in the Foreground (Thyssen-Bornemisza Museum), which shows a skater on the ice who falls over and reveals her bare buttocks.

Although his stylistic development is still little understood, in his late works anecdotal details decreased markedly and were replaced by intimate views of the landscape. These late works anticipate the type of forest landscape made popular by artists of the next generation, such as David Vinckboons and the artists of the Frankenthal school.

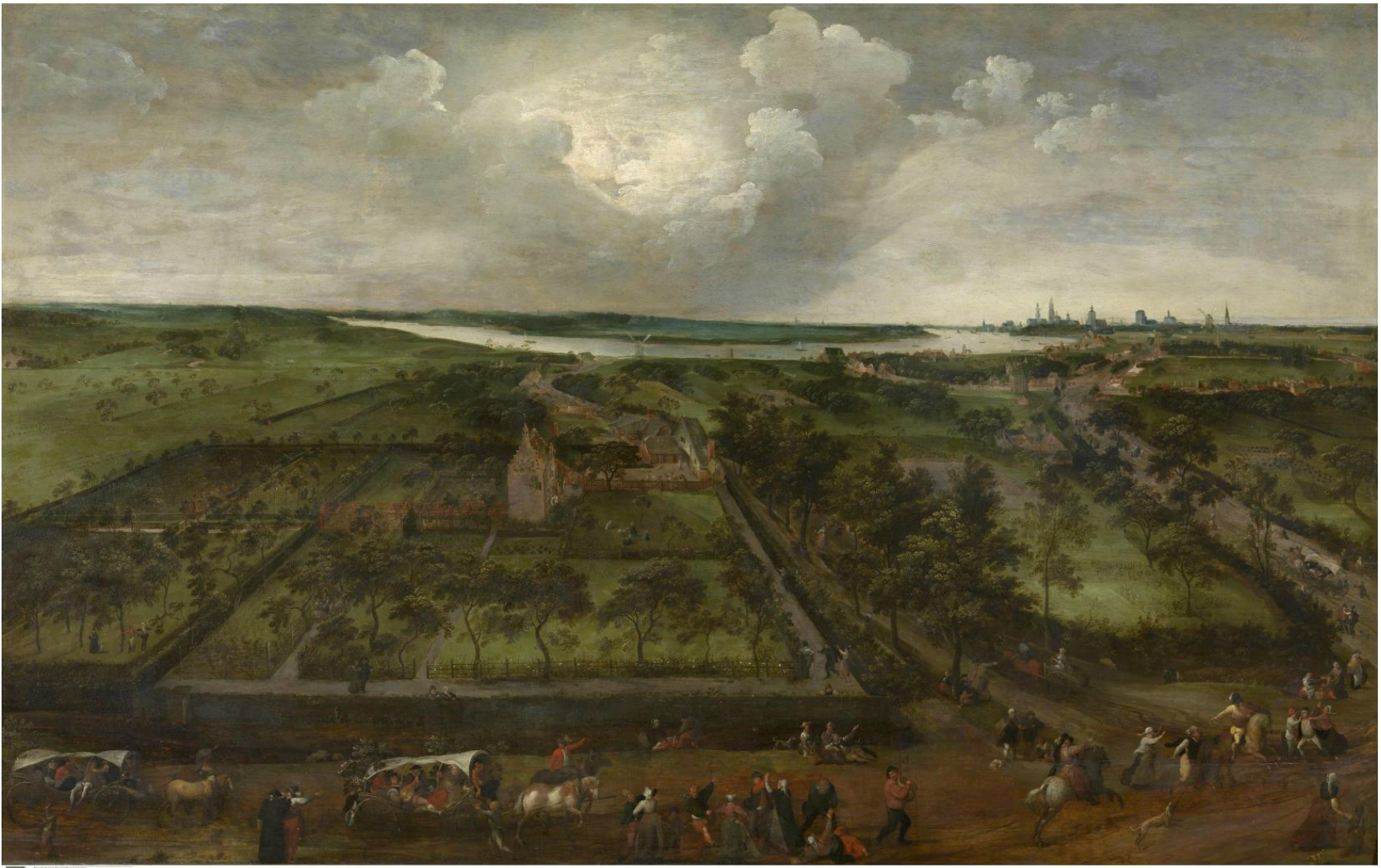
View of the Kiel at Antwerp

Jacob's extant pictures show explicit connection to the region around Antwerp. Some of his views of Antwerp adhere to the "town-and-country" format, a kind of combination of a rural view with a city view. An example is his panoramic View of the Kiel (1578, Royal Museum of Fine Arts Antwerp) where the city appears only on the far-right distance. Another example is the View of the Scheldt near Antwerp (1587, Royal Museum of Fine Arts Antwerp), which depicts a somewhat different aspect of country pastimes. Only in the distant horizon are the towers of Antwerp visible.

Grimmer's work was influential on the next generation of Flemish landscape painters including his son Abel as well as Gillis van Coninxloo, Jan Brueghel the Younger and Jan Wildens.

=== Collaborations ===
As was common practice in the Antwerp art sector, Jacob Grimmer often collaborated with other specialist artists. Collaborations with Marten van Cleve and Gillis Mostaert who painted the staffage in his landscapes are recorded. Collaborations with Mostaert appear to have been particularly frequent. An example is a pair of landscapes representing 'Spring' and 'Winter', which may have been part of a cycle on the seasons (Auctioned at Sotheby's, London on 3 December 2008, lot 7). In this pair of paintings the artists depict everyday life by filling every corner with some anecdotal detail. They and their workshops repeated these compositions on several further occasions and numerous smaller repetitions, of varying degrees of quality, are known.

=== Prints ===
Some of Grimmer's landscape designs were turned into prints. A set of 12 Landscape Views in the Environs of Antwerp were engraved by Adriaen Collaert. The set was published probably in Antwerp in the 1580s. The prints resemble his painted series of the Months and Seasons. He seems to take some liberty with the actual scenery and makes the landscape much more dramatic and hilly than was actually the case in the environs of Antwerp.

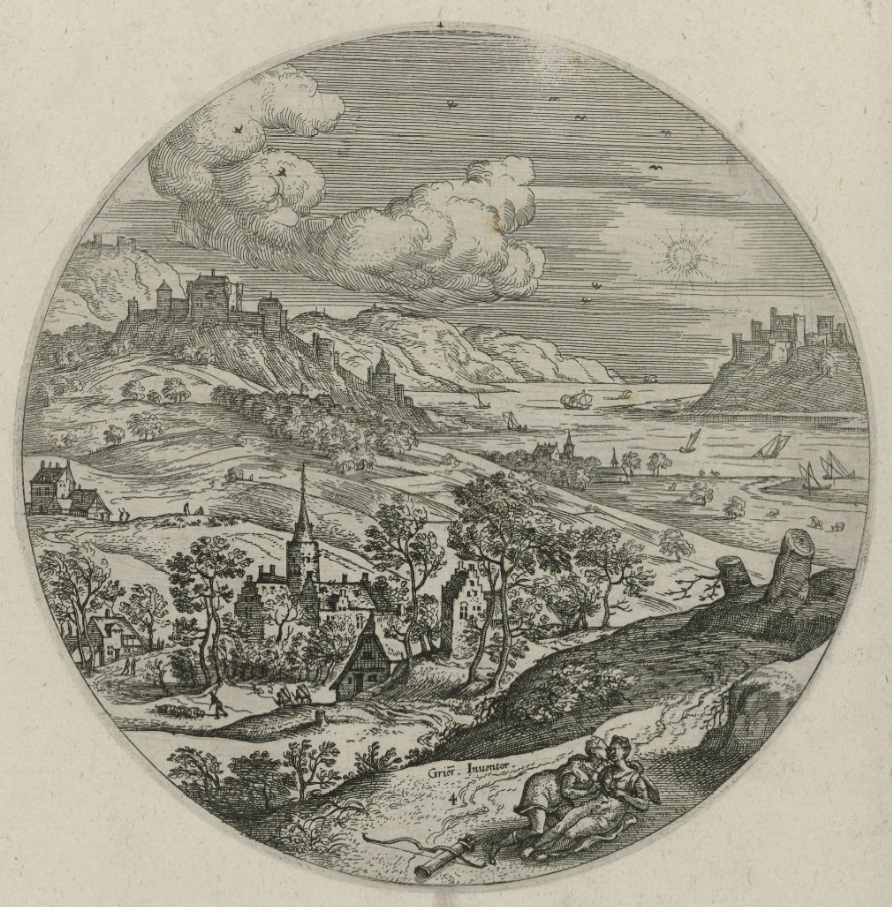
Procris dies in the arms of Cephalus

Another series of 24 views of sites around Brussels engraved by Hans Collaer and first issued in Antwerp in the 1580s is likely also based on drawings by Grimmer. These prints show a more topographical interest, and unlike the Antwerp series, clearly identify the location depicted on both the prints and the five surviving drawings.

Jacob Grimmer also designed a set of four roundels of Landscapes with Cephalus and Procris. They were engraved and published by Philip Galle. The first two of the prints were based on the landscape backgrounds in two drawings with Hagar, Ishmael and the Angel (1586, Ashmolean Museum, Oxford). Both the mythological subjects as well as the scenery with its rolling hills and punctuated by a few tall trees, reveal their debt to Hieronymus Cock's 1558 landscape print cycle of 'Landscapes with Biblical and Mythological Scenes' after designs by his brother Matthys Cock.

== Sources ==
- Walter S. Gibson, 'Pleasant Places: The Rustic Landscape from Bruegel to Ruisdael', University of California Press, 2000
