= Romanist =

Romanist may refer to:

- A person who studies the history of Rome
- A historian or archaeologist who specialises in Ancient Rome
- A person who is a student of the Romance languages
- A Netherlandish painter painting in the Romanist style
- Romanist, a derogatory term for a Roman Catholic
- Historically, someone perceived to be in favor of Rome Rule in Ireland, as a pejorative
- A modern worshipper of the Roman gods
- Someone who is Pan-Romanist
