= Romanism (painting) =

16th-century art movement

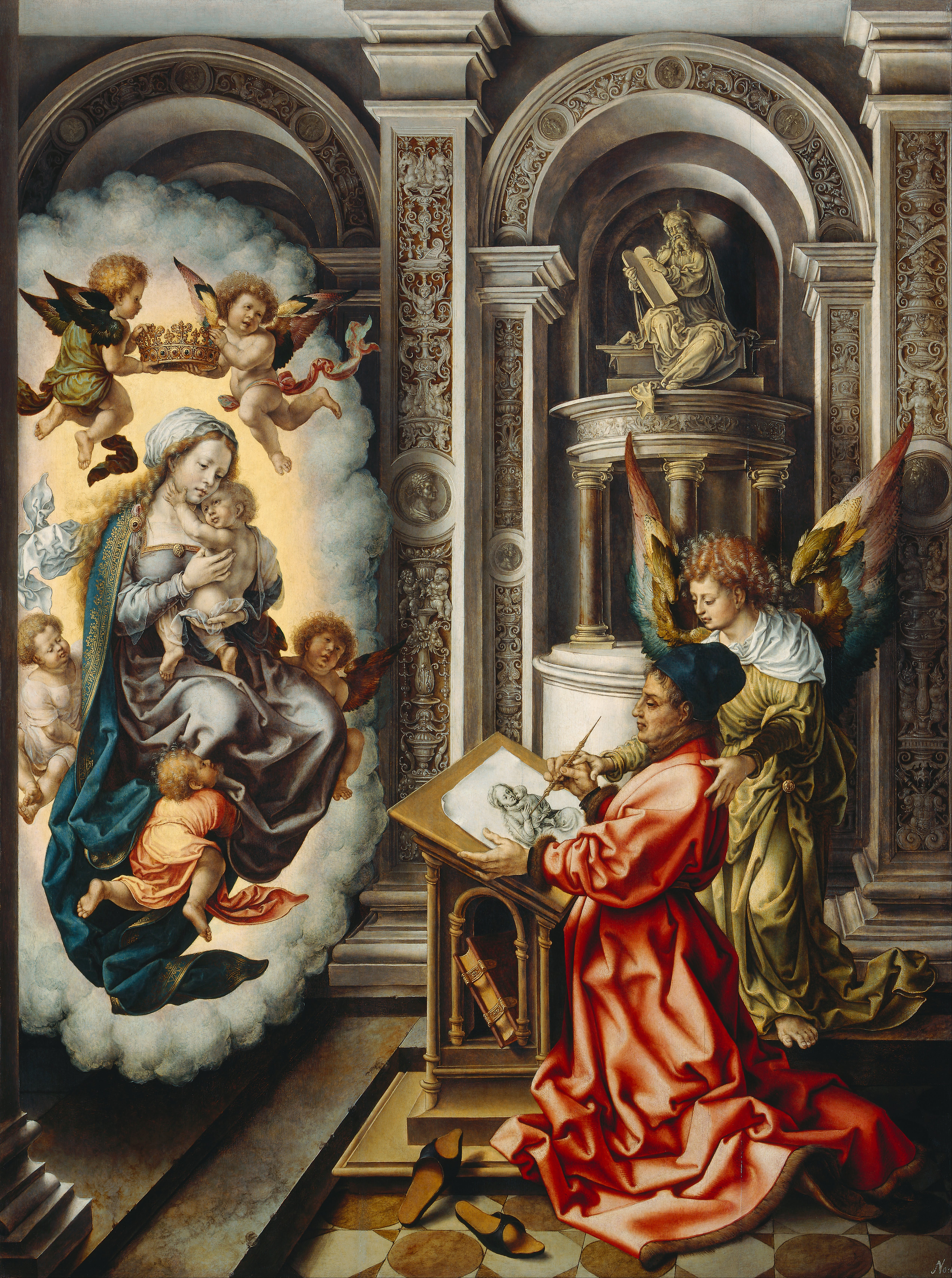
St. Luke painting the Madonna by Jan Gossaert

Romanism is a term used by art historians to refer to painters from the Low Countries who had travelled in the 16th century to Rome. In Rome they had absorbed the influence of leading Italian artists of the period such as Michelangelo and Raphael and his pupils. Upon their return home, these Northern artists (referred to as ‘Romanists’) created a Renaissance style, which assimilated Italian formal language. The style continued its influence until the early 17th century when it was swept aside by the Baroque.

By drawing on mythological subject matter, the Romanists introduced new themes in Northern art that corresponded with the interests and tastes of their patrons with a humanist education. The Romanists painted mainly religious and mythological works, often using complex compositions and depicting naked human bodies in an anatomically correct way but with contrived poses. Their style often appears forced and artificial to the modern viewer. However, the artists saw their efforts as an intellectual challenge to render difficult subjects through a struggle with form.

The term Romanism is now less commonly used as a better understanding of the work of the artists that formed part of the Romantics has highlighted the diversity rather than the commonalities in their responses to Italian art.

== Development of the term ==
The term Romanist was coined by 19th-century art historians such as Alfred Michiels and Eugène Fromentin who had noticed a significant shift in the style of Northern painting in the 16th century. They attributed the shift to the influence of artists who had visited Italy, an in particular Rome, and called them Romanists.

Whereas the term was initially used mainly to refer to the first group who traveled to Rome in the first half of the 16th century, its application was extended by some art historians such as Jane Turner in The Dictionary of Art to include a second generation of artists who made the trip in the second half of the 16th century.

== The Romanists ==
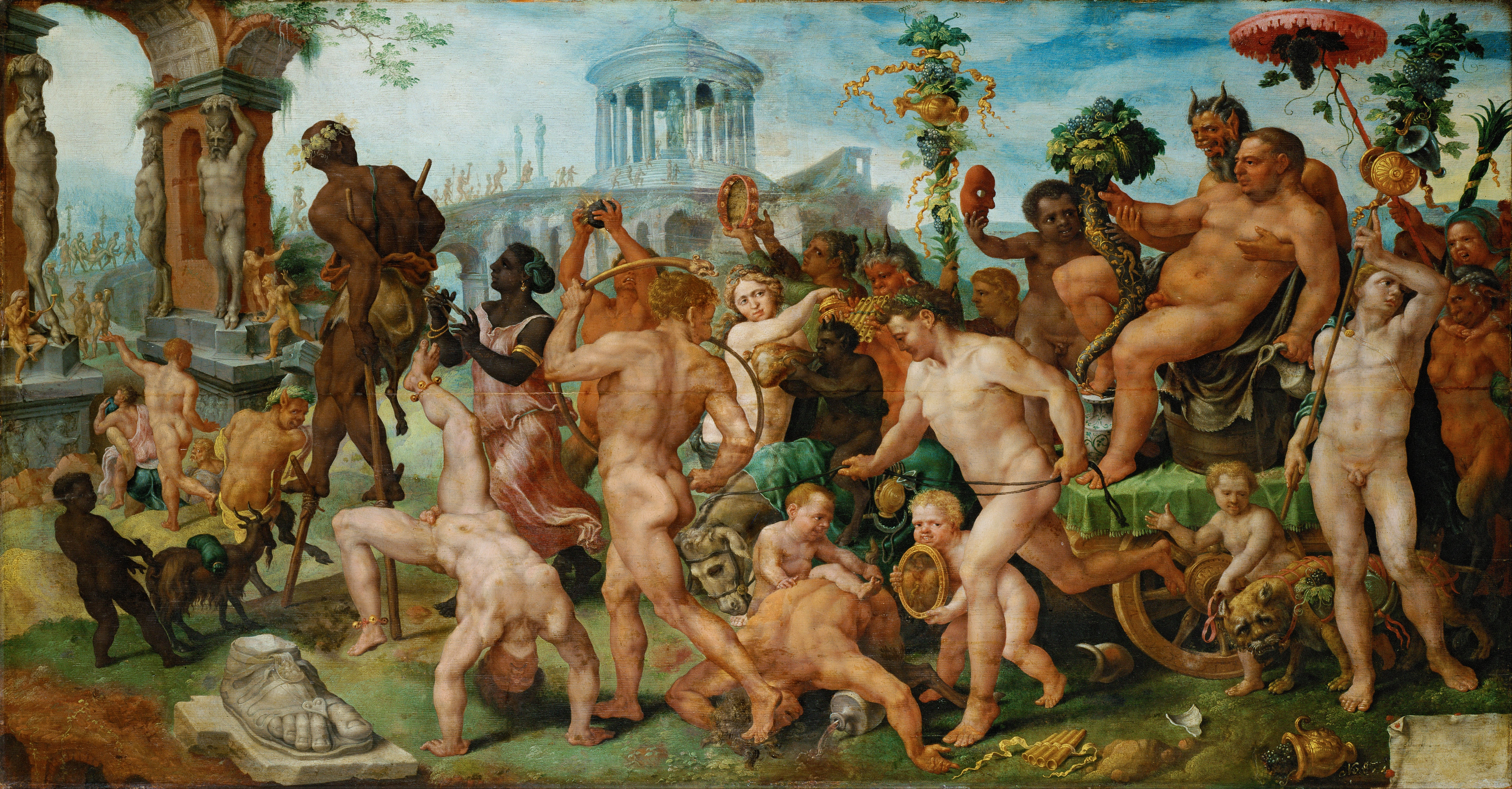
Triumphal procession of Bacchus by Maerten van Heemskerck

In the first group of artists who went to Rome to study contemporary Italian art as well as the Classical models are typically included Jan Gossaert, Jan van Scorel, Maarten van Heemskerck, Pieter Coecke van Aelst, Lambert Lombard, Jan Sanders van Hemessen, Michiel Coxie and Frans Floris. Bernard van Orley is often also included in this group even though he likely never visited Italy and only familiarized himself with the Italian style from prints and Raphael’s cartoons for the papal tapestries, which were woven in Brussels.

Jan Gossaert was one of the first Netherlandish artists to make the Rome trip in 1508/9 and after his return to the northern Netherlands, he mainly painted mythological scenes. Jan van Scorel worked in Rome in the years 1522 and 1523 where he was particularly impressed by Michelangelo and Raphael. Pieter Coecke van Aelst was probably in Italy before 1527. Jan Sanders van Hemessen traveled to Italy early in his career, around 1520. Here he studied both models from classical antiquity, such as the Laocoön Group as well as the contemporary works of Michelangelo and Raphael. Michiel Coxie of Mechelen was in Rome for a longer period of time roughly between 1529 and 1538. He was most influenced by Raphael (hence his nickname ‘the Flemish Raphael') and worked in a completely Italianized style upon his return. Maarten van Heemskerck travelled to Rome around 1532 where he produced many paintings and drawings after Classical sculpture. After his return to the north, his work helped spread a very Italianizing style, with a particular emphasis on the anatomy of the naked human body.

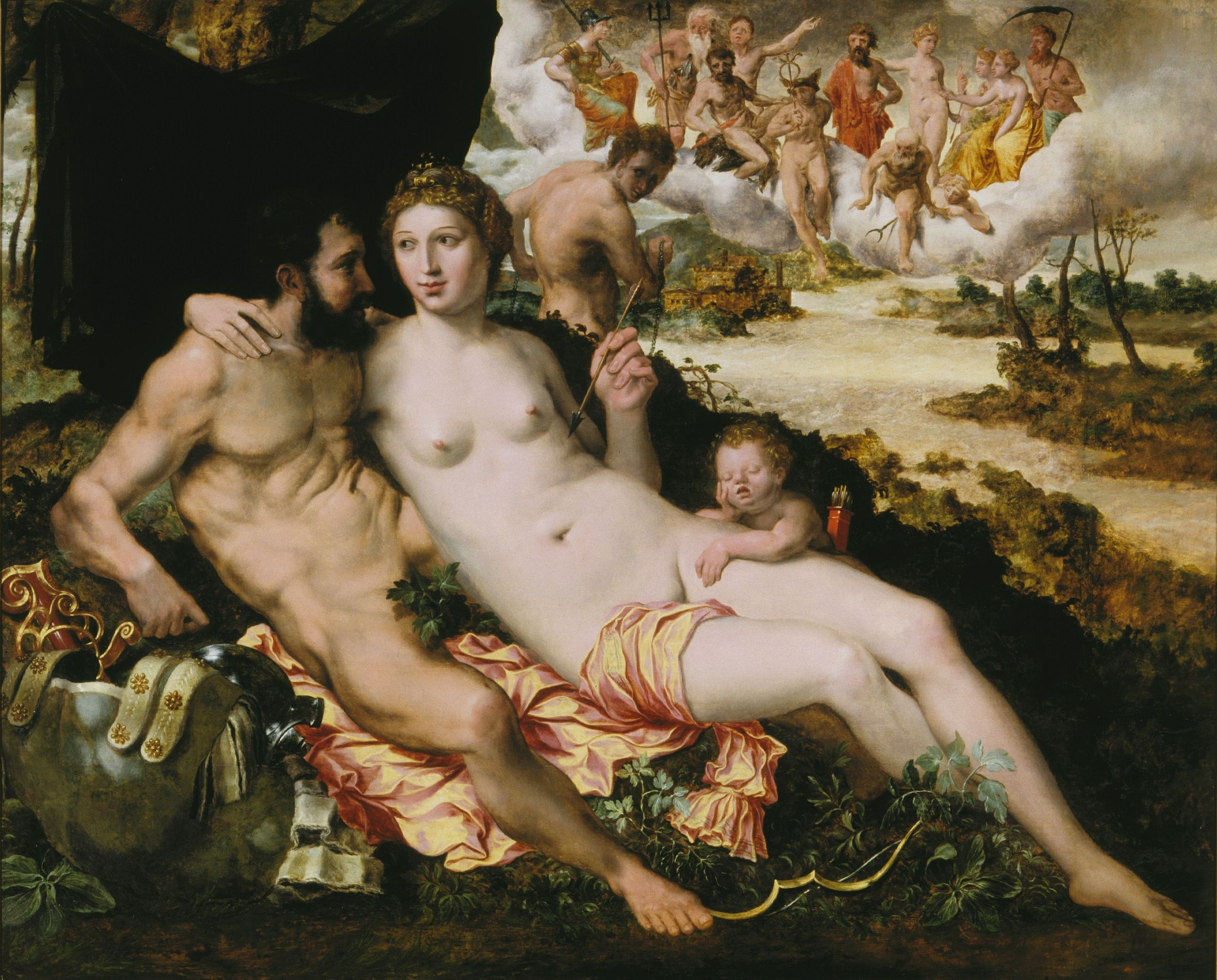
Venus en Mars by Frans Floris

Lambert Lombard of Liège travelled to Rome in 1537 and developed influential theories about classicism. He may have encouraged his pupil Frans Floris to study in Rome as well. Floris was in Rome from about 1540 and was influenced mainly by Michelangelo and Giulio Romano. He became upon his return one of the most influential Romanists in Antwerp who helped spread the new style through his large workshop and numerous students and followers including Crispin van den Broeck, Frans Pourbus the Elder, Lambert van Noort, Anthonie Blocklandt van Montfoort, Marten de Vos and the brothers Ambrosius I and Frans Francken I.

A second group of Northern artists who travelled to Rome in the second half of the 16th century included Dirck Barendsz, Adriaen de Weerdt, Hans Speckaert en Bartholomäus Spranger. The last two artists did not return home although Spranger exerted an important influence through other Northern artists who spent time at the Prague court where he worked. This later generation of artists are usually referred to as Mannerists. They showed a greater feeling for proportion and used a simpler formal language then the first generation of Romanists.

== Italian influences ==
The most important influences on the Romanists were works by Michelangelo (particularly his work in the Sistine Chapel), Raphael (frescoes in the Raphael Rooms), and Raphael’s students such as Giulio Romano, Polidoro da Caravaggio and Perino del Vaga. The Classical monuments and artefacts in Rome were also an important object of study and inspiration for Netherlandish artists in Rome.

In a later phase other Italian cities exercised an important appeal in particular Venice, where Domenico Tintoretto was the principal source of inspiration. Rosso Fiorentino, Vasari and various sculptors were the Florentine artists that appealed to the Northern artists while in Emilia, Parmigianino and his followers were the preferred models.

== See also ==
- Guild of Romanists
