= Abel Grimmer =

Flemish painter

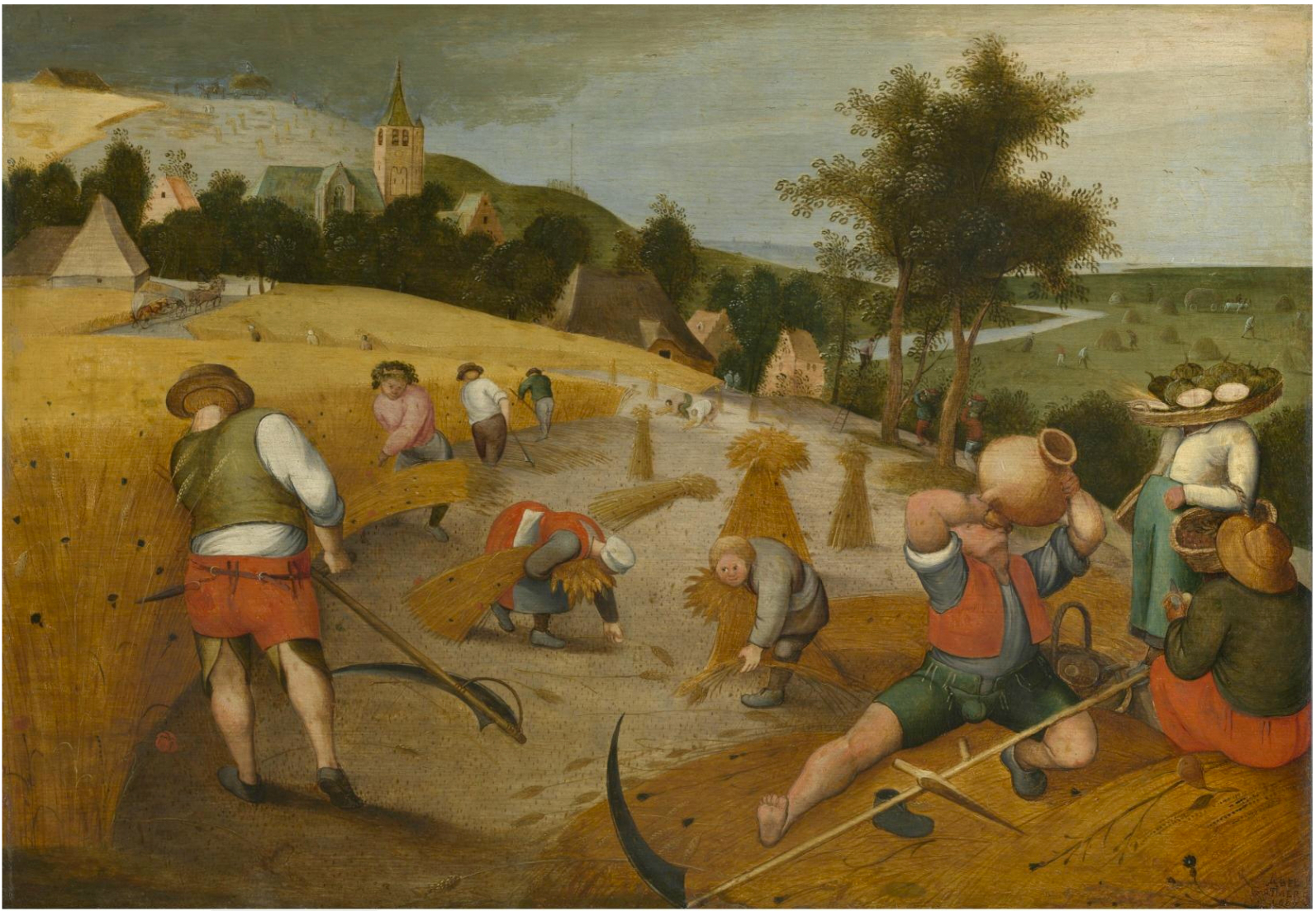
Summer, 1607

Abel Grimmer (family name variations: 'Grimer' and 'Grimmaert') (c. 1570–c. 1620) was a Flemish late Renaissance painter, mainly of landscapes and, to a lesser extent, of architectural paintings. His works were important in the development towards more naturalism in Flemish landscape painting.

== Life ==
Grimmer was born and died in Antwerp. He learned to paint from his father, the landscape painter Jacob Grimmer. His father Jacob Grimmer had established a name for himself by imitating the work of Pieter Bruegel the Elder on small panel pictures and selling these on the market at low prices.

Abel Grimmer married Catharina Lescornet on 29 September 1591 and became a master of the Antwerp Guild of Saint Luke in 1592. He took over his father's workshop. He worked his whole career in Antwerp. The date of his death is not known exactly and is placed after 1620.

== Work ==
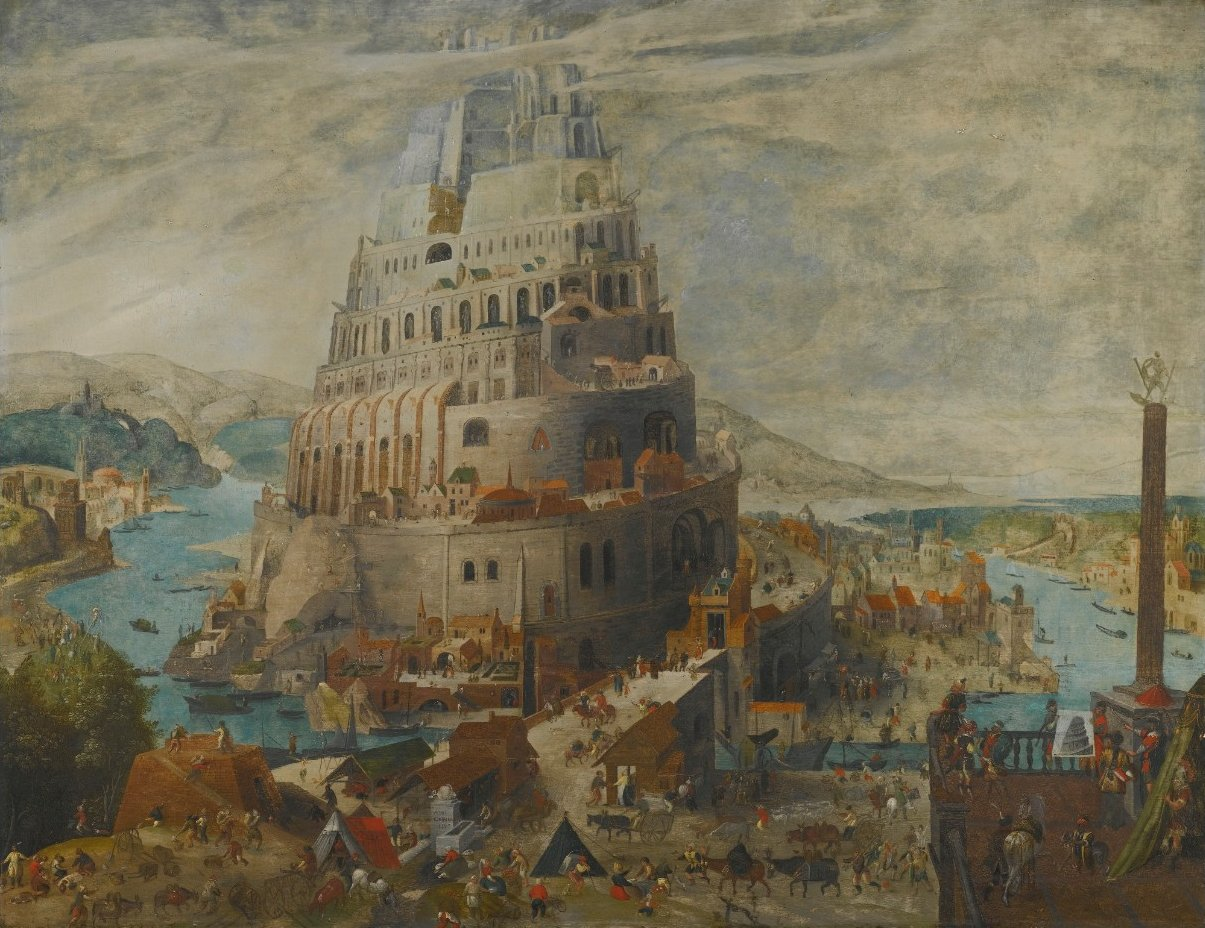
The Tower of Babel, at the Louvre Abu Dhabi

He often signed and dated his panels. His earliest dated work dates from 1586 and his latest dated work reads "162", so it is dated 1620 or later. He is principally known for his paintings in small format of country scenes, sometimes with a biblical theme. The works were at times in the form of roundels (i.e. in a round format). Many of his paintings were dedicated to the Four Seasons or the Months of the Year. The paintings were sometimes inspired by or even copied from prints by Pieter Bruegel the Elder and Hans Bol. Abel's work generally shows a strong influence of Bruegel and Bol as well as of his own father's work. His series of the Twelve Months (dated 1592; held in the Chapelle Notre-Dame in Montfaucon-en-Velay) is an exact copy of Adriaen Collaert's prints made after paintings by Hans Bol and published by Hans van Luyck in 1585. The paintings Spring and Summer (Royal Museum of Fine Arts Antwerp) are almost exact copies of two prints by Pieter van der Heyden after designs by Pieter Bruegel the Elder.

Abel Grimmer's work is characterised by the simplification and systemisation of figures and landscapes. His landscapes show splendid colour harmonies and a certain linearity, through their slightly schematized compositions and their tendency to represent buildings as geometric shapes. His work has been dismissed because of this simplification and its reliance on the work of others. However, it is this combination that enabled him to survive in the Antwerp marketplace. He managed to be so prolific because he had streamlined his technique. Each pictorial area of his landscapes was composed in a single color with little or no modulation. He applied minimal varnishing, which eliminated the effects of roundness and reflection. This stylization and codification of established landscape formulas allowed him to make these works almost as inexpensive and widely available as prints. Jacob Grimmer was one of the first Netherlandish artists to break with the tradition of the mountain landscape pioneered by Joachim Patinir, the founder of the so-called world landscape. Abel Grimmer rather depicted broad landscapes of the Flemish countryside characterised by naturalism and a close observation of nature.

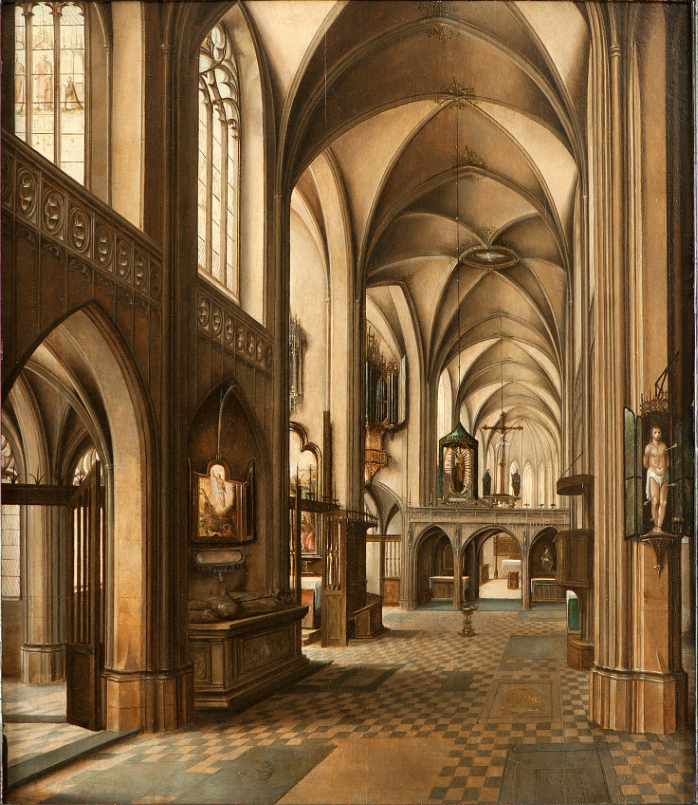
Church interior

A favourite theme of Abel Grimmer was the Tower of Babel of which he produced several versions, clearly inspired by Pieter Bruegel the Elder's treatment of the same subject. The subject is taken from the Book of Genesis 11:1-9. This narrates the story of the decision to build a city and a tower reaching into the heavens. The biblical character Nimrod was appointed to oversee the project's construction. This story was a rich source of subject matter for various late 16th and early 17th century Flemish painters. Their representations were inspired by the two works of 1563 by Pieter Bruegel the Elder on this subject matter (Kunsthistorisches Museum, Vienna; and Museum Boijmans Van Beuningen, Rotterdam). The story of the Tower of Babel is in essence a reflection on human impiety and hubris, a moral message already implicit in both Bruegel's paintings. The architecture of the Tower of Babel in Grimmer's paintings of the subject echoes that of the Colosseum, which in the 16th-century symbolised the decay of imperial Rome. Grimmer's treatment of this subject can also be interpreted as a comment on the turbulent times in which he was living. His home country - the Spanish Netherlands - was at the time he created the paintings engaged in a struggle with the breakaway Protestant provinces in the north. The story of the Tower of Babel also tells about a world in which people speaking one language are suddenly riven with the incomprehension of many different languages. This paralleled the 16th century, when the once united Netherlands became divided between a Catholic south and a Protestant north which vigorously debated the interpretation of the bible and the role of the church. Abel Grimmer collaborated with several different figure painters who provided the staffage in his Babel paintings.

Abel Grimmer also produced architectural paintings including church interiors such as the Interior of a Gothic Church with a Franciscan Monk Preaching (sold at Sotheby's in London on 9 March 1983). His interest in perspective and the use of a golden light anticipate the work of the Dutch painter of church interiors Pieter Saenredam. His paintings of interior views, such as A Ball (Wrotham Park, Hertfordshire) and Jesus in the House of Martha and Mary (Royal Museums of Fine Arts of Belgium) show Abel's interest in portraying interior space. Both works are clearly inspired by Hans Vredeman de Vries who also painted a Jesus in the House of Martha and Mary (Royal Collection). He relied on other artists such as Frans Francken the Younger to paint the staffage in his architectural paintings. He would occasionally paint church interiors without staffage. An example is the Church interior (Galen Galerie). This depicts a church interior without any figures and shows the artist's interest in architecture and atmosphere. Earlier scholars suggested that Abel was also an architect on the basis of two autograph architectural drawings depicting respectively an elevation of the gable of Antwerp Cathedral and a church gable with a Gothic spire.
