= The Incredulity of Saint Thomas (Tzanes) =

Painting by Emmanuel Tzanes

- Η Ψηλάφηση του Θωμά (Greek), Incredulità di san Tommaso (Italian)
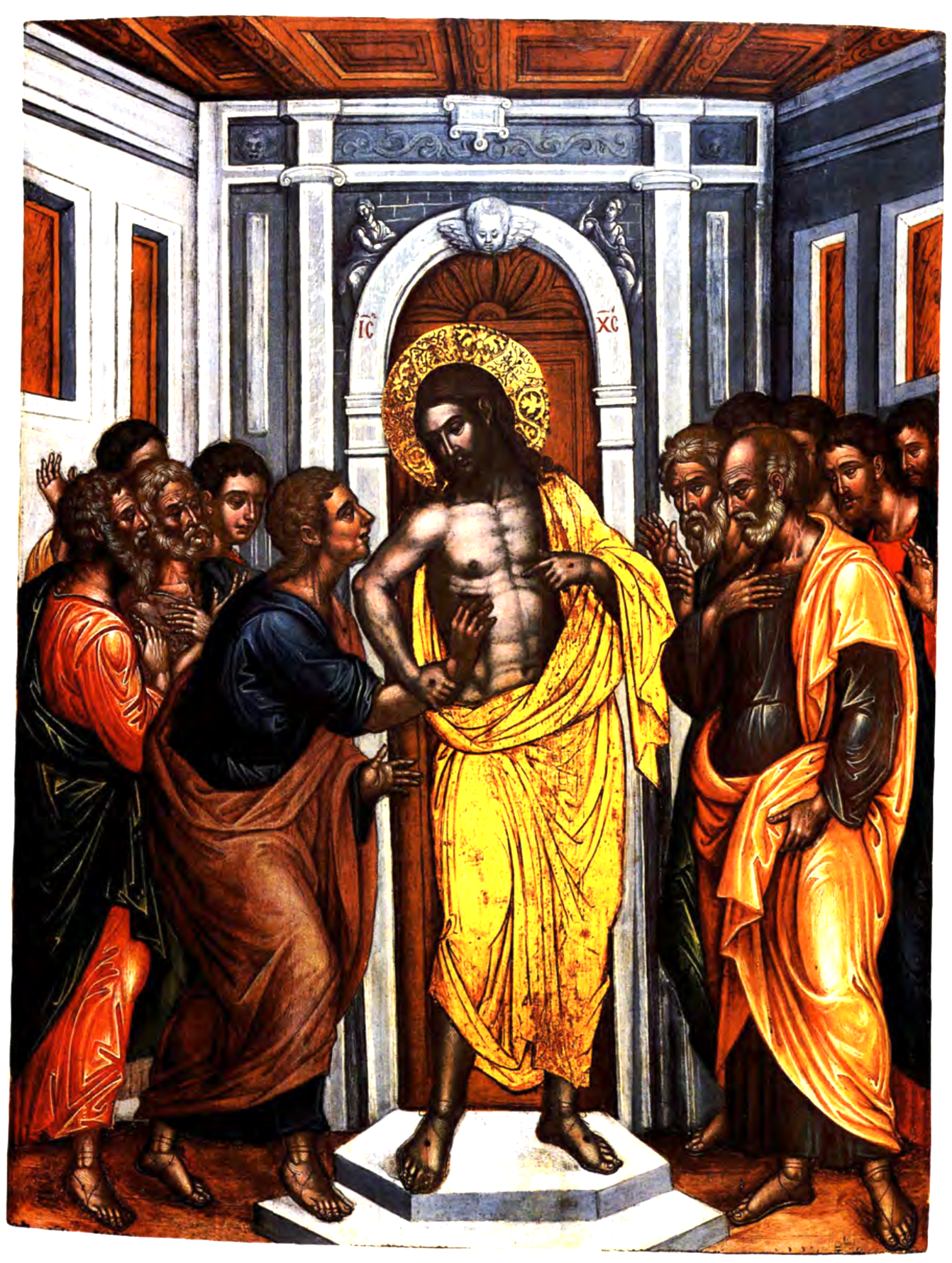
- Artist: Emmanuel Tzanes
- Year: c. 1650-1690
- Medium: tempera on wood
- Movement: Heptanese School
- Subject: Doubting Thomas
- Dimensions: 77.9 cm × 59.9 cm (30.7 in × 23.6 in)
- Location: Hellenic Institute, Venice, Italy
- Owner: Hellenic Institute

The Incredulity of Saint Thomas is a tempera painting created by Greek painter Emmanuel Tzanes. Tzanes features a catalog of artwork numbering over one hundred works. He was one of the most prolific artists of the 1600s painting in Crete, Corfu, and Venice. His two brothers Marinos Tzanes and Konstantinos Tzanes were also famous painters but Marinos is more well known for his famous poem The Cretan War (O Kritikos Polemos) Ο Κρητικός Πόλεμος. All three artists were members of the Late Cretan School and early Heptanese School (painting) they were known for participating in the movement that integrated Flemish engravings into the Greek and Italian art world.

According to the account of the Gospel of John; the Apostle Thomas doubted to believe the resurrection of Jesus Christ without direct personal experience. He did not believe the resurrected Jesus appeared to the ten other apostles until he could see and feel Jesus' crucifixion wounds. In the story the Apostle Thomas is known as Doubting Thomas. The work of art is a depiction of the historic event.

Countless Greek and Italian painters have artistically depicted the dramatic event. Caravaggio created a notable depiction known as The Incredulity of Saint Thomas (Caravaggio). Two works of art are similar to the painting. One was an engraving completed by famous German artist Albrecht Dürer in the early 1500s featuring the dramatic event also entitled the Incredulity of Saint Thomas and the other is a painting entitled The Incredulity of Thomas created by Maerten de Vos painted in the middle of the 1500s. Two other notable Italian works feature similar complex geometric structures in the background. The work is part of the collection of the Hellenic Institute of Venice Museum.

== History ==
The painting was created using the traditional egg tempera paint and wood panel. The height of the work is 30.7 inches (77.9 cm) and the width of the work is 23.6 inches (59.9cm). The work was completed later in the artists career and is considered one of his mature works. It is similar to two other works completed by Tzanes entitled Christ Healing the Blind and the Samaritan Woman at the Well. Two works by other artists that resemble the painting are an engraving completed by famous German artist Albrecht Dürer and a painting entitled The Incredulity of Thomas created by Maerten de Vos. Tzanes was exposed to the works of both artists. Greek painters of the period copied Flemish and German paintings and engravings. The work is extremely complex and falls in the era of the early Heptanese School. In the background, the artist painted a wall with complex decorative pillars. The wall features painted sculptures and an archway above a door. Maerten de Vos also painted a similar complex geometric design. Albrecht Dürer grouped the figures in his engraving in an orientation similar to both artists. Both Durer and Tzanes painted a heavenly aura above the Christ figure. Thomas has an overwhelming expression of joy that he can see Jesus Christ through direct personal experience. According to John 20:27, Jesus appeared to his disciples, including Thomas, eight days after his resurrection. Jesus invited Thomas the Apostle to touch his hands on his side to feel his wounds which led to doubting Thomas' confession of faith. The Christ figure is sculpturesque and the artist attempts to reveal the figure's anatomy clearly establishing lines, contours, and grooves. Eleven figures are present to witness the event. They are all dressed in lavish majestic divine costumes which is the customary representation of the apostles. They are also comparable to the Ancient Greek philosophers of the time. Some of the figures are younger while others are older. Specifically, the two figures to our right of the celestial figure of Christ are depicted as older and wiser men. Tzanes escapes his traditional Cretan mannerism by adding spatial depth and three-dimensionality to his canvas. The painting was donated to San Giorgio dei Greci by Maria Kayianni in 1968. She was the widow of Andreas Chalkiopoulos from Rethymnon, Crete. Traces of the painter's signature can be seen at the bottom of the image. The work is attributed to Emmanuel Tzane and dates to the 17th century.

== Gallery ==
=== Notable works ===
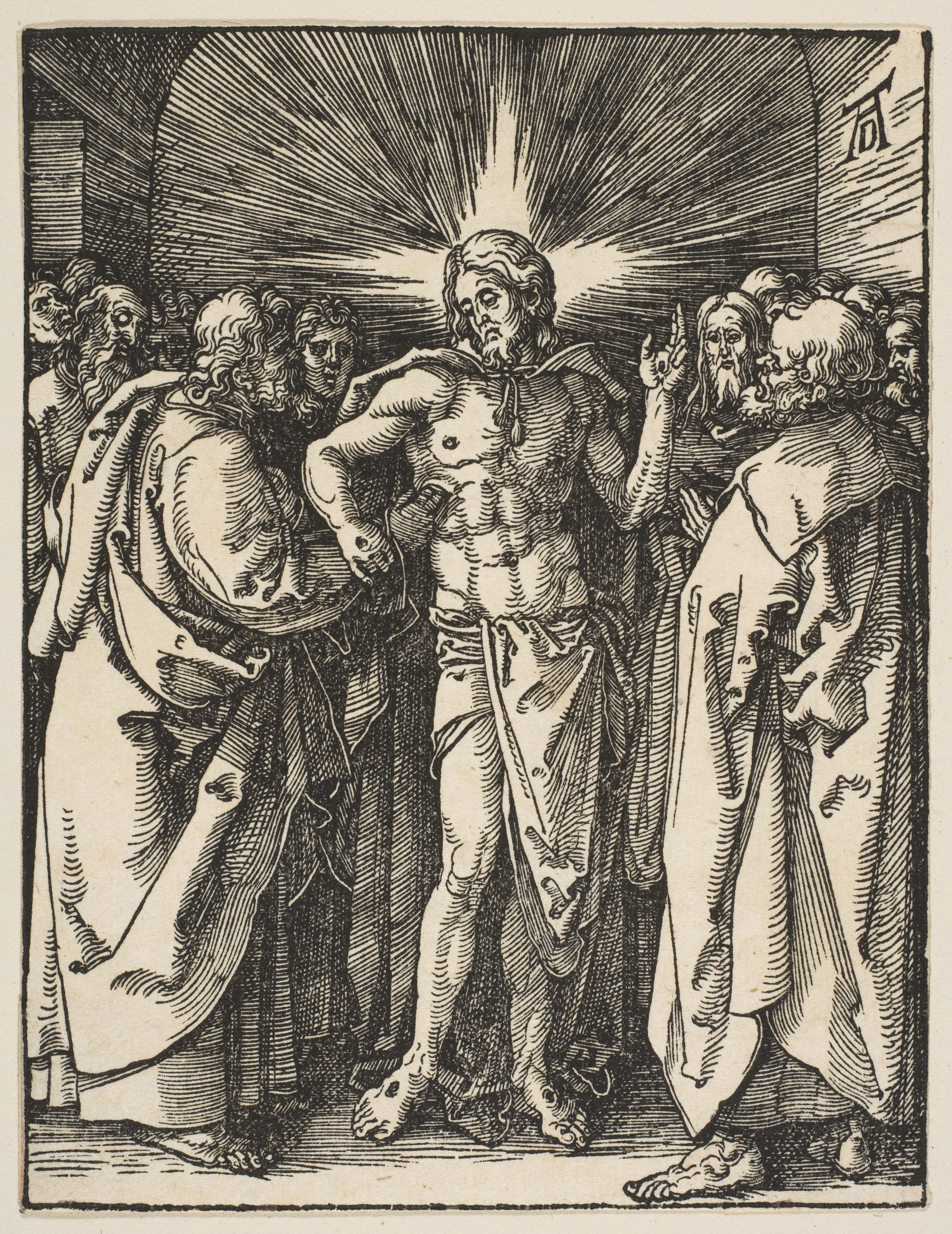
Doubting Thomas, Dürer

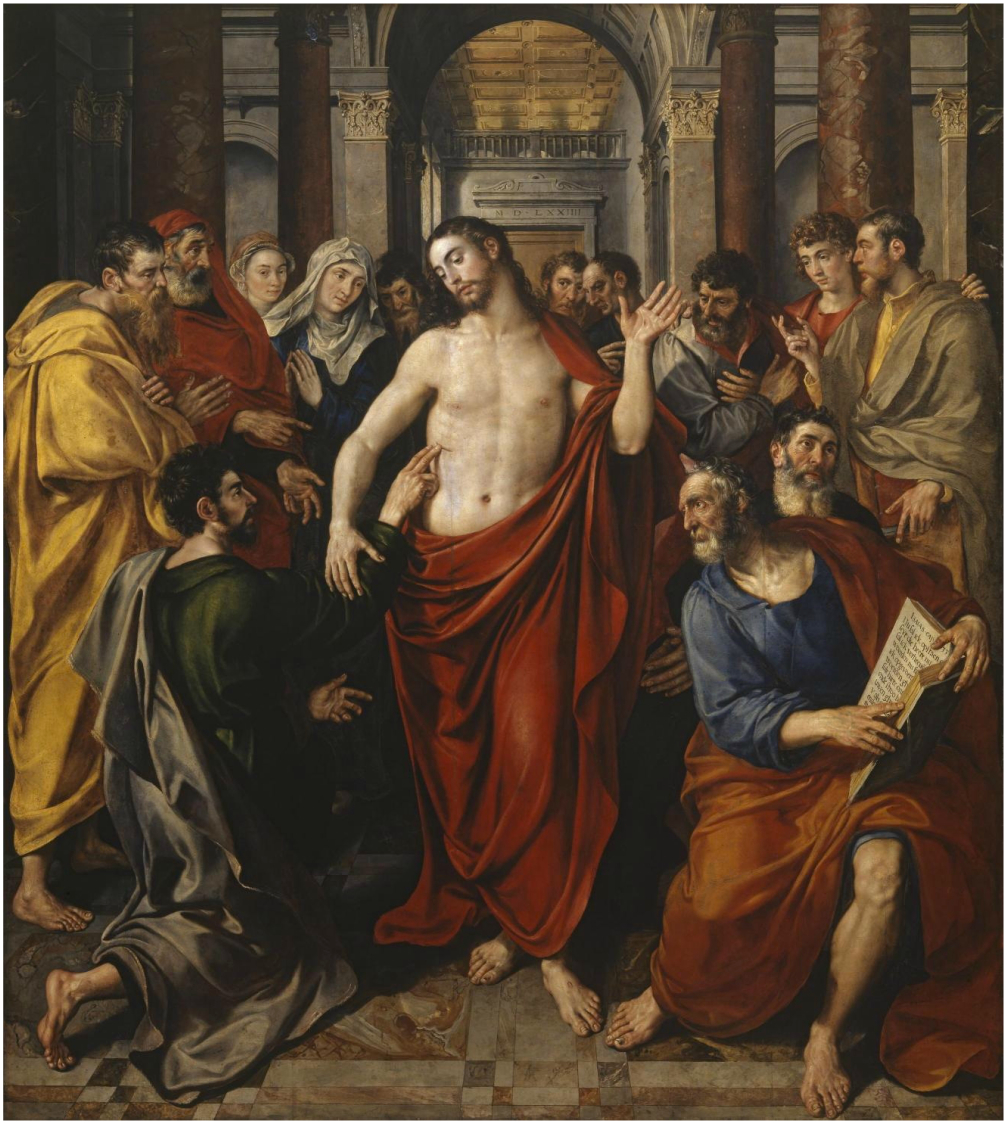
Doubting Thomas Maerten de Vos

Doubting Thomas Caravaggio

=== Similar works ===
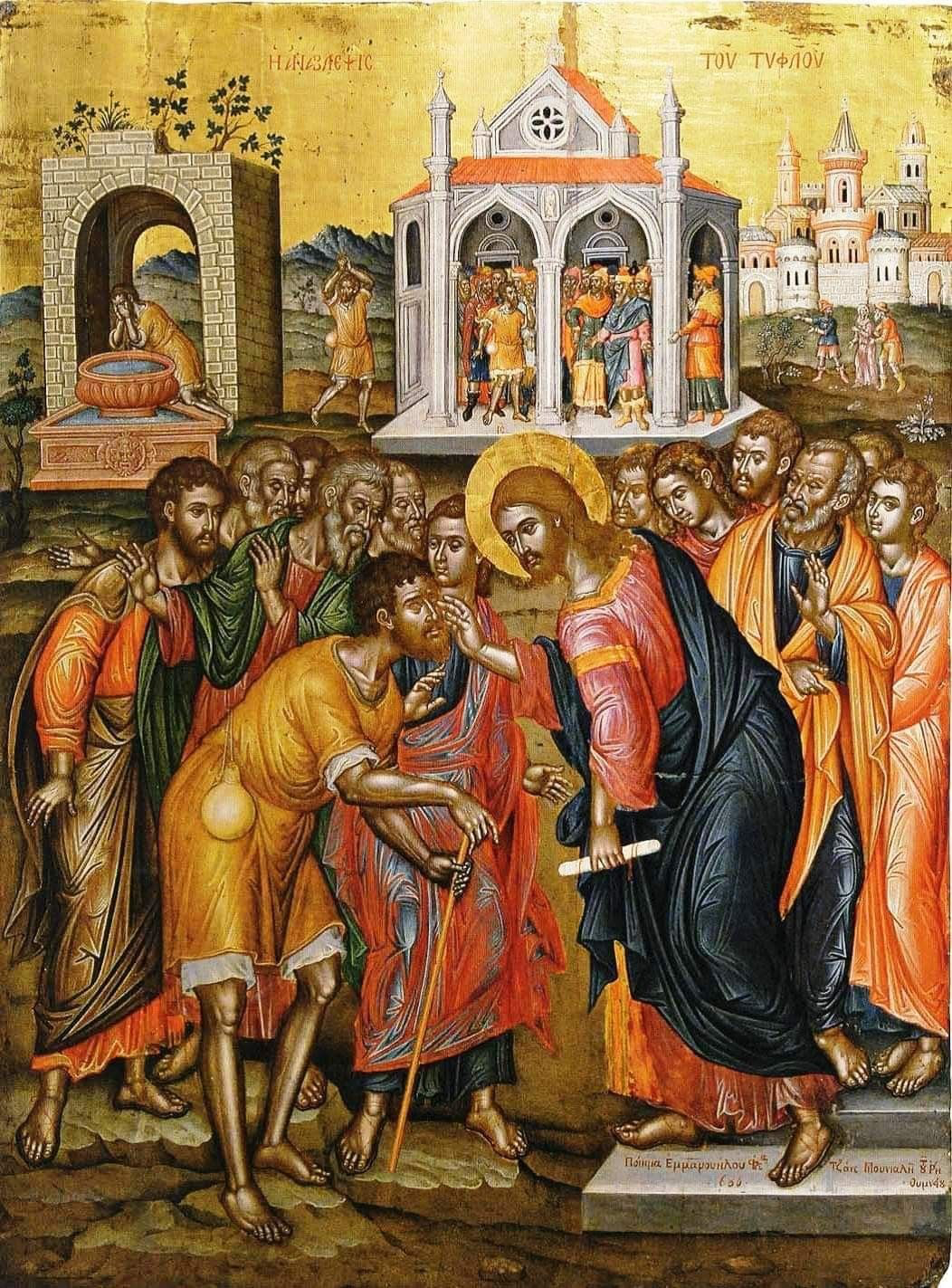
Christ Healing the Blind, Tzanes

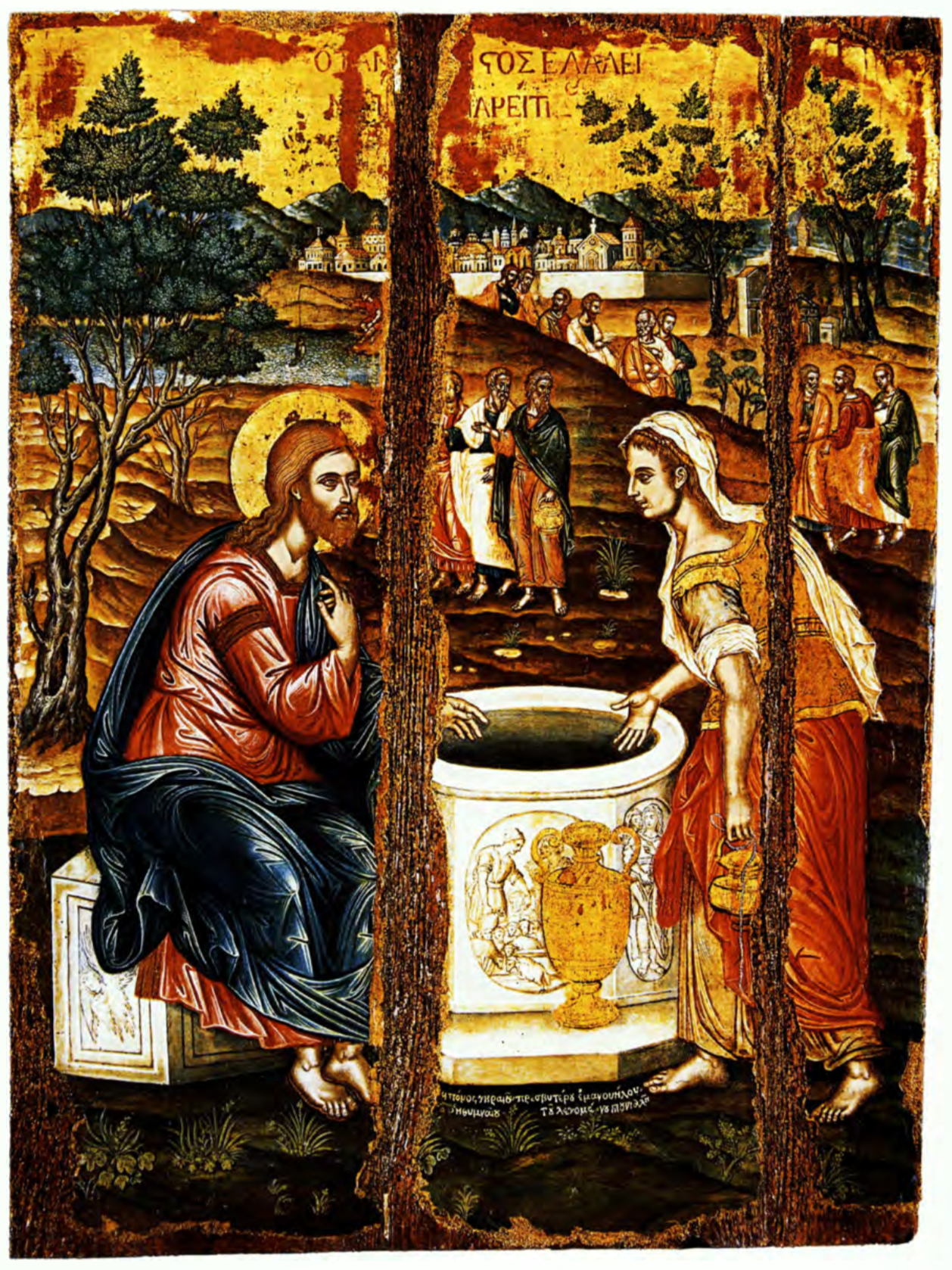
Samaritan Woman at the Well Tzanes

== See also ==
- The Last Supper (Damaskinos)

== Bibliography ==
- Hatzidakis, Manolis; Drakopoulou, Evgenia (1997). Έλληνες Ζωγράφοι μετά την Άλωση (1450-1830). Τόμος 2: Καβαλλάρος - Ψαθόπουλος [Greek Painters after the Fall of Constantinople (1450-1830). Volume 2: Kavallaros - Psathopoulos]. Athens: Center for Modern Greek Studies, National Research Foundation. hdl:10442/14088. ISBN 960-7916-00-X.
- Tselenti-Papadopoulou, Niki G. (2002). Οι Εικονες της Ελληνικης Αδελφοτητας της Βενετιας απο το 16ο εως το Πρωτο Μισο του 20ου Αιωνα: Αρχειακη Τεκμηριωση [The Icons of the Greek Brotherhood of Venice from 1600 to First Half of the 20th Century] (PDF) (in Greek). Athens: Ministry of Culture Publication of the Archaeological Bulletin No. 81. ISBN 960-214-221-9.
- Paliouras, Athanasios D. (1976). A Guide to the Museum of Icons and the Church of St. George. Venice, Italy: Hellenic Institute of Venice.
- Speake, Graham (2021). Encyclopedia of Greece and the Hellenic Tradition. London And New York: Rutledge Taylor & Francis Group. ISBN 9781135942137.
