= Maerten de Vos =

Flemish painter and printmaker (1532–1603)

Maerten de Vos

Maerten de Vos, Maerten de Vos the Elder or Marten de Vos (1532 – 4 December 1603) was a Flemish painter, known mainly for his history and allegorical paintings and portraits. He was, together with the brothers Ambrosius Francken I and Frans Francken I, one of the leading history painters in the Spanish Netherlands after Frans Floris's career slumped in the second half of the sixteenth century as a result of the Iconoclastic Fury.

De Vos was a prolific draughtsman and produced numerous designs for the Antwerp printers. These were circulated widely in Europe and the Spanish colonies and contributed to his international reputation and influence. His designs were also used as models for tapestries and stained glass windows.

== Life ==
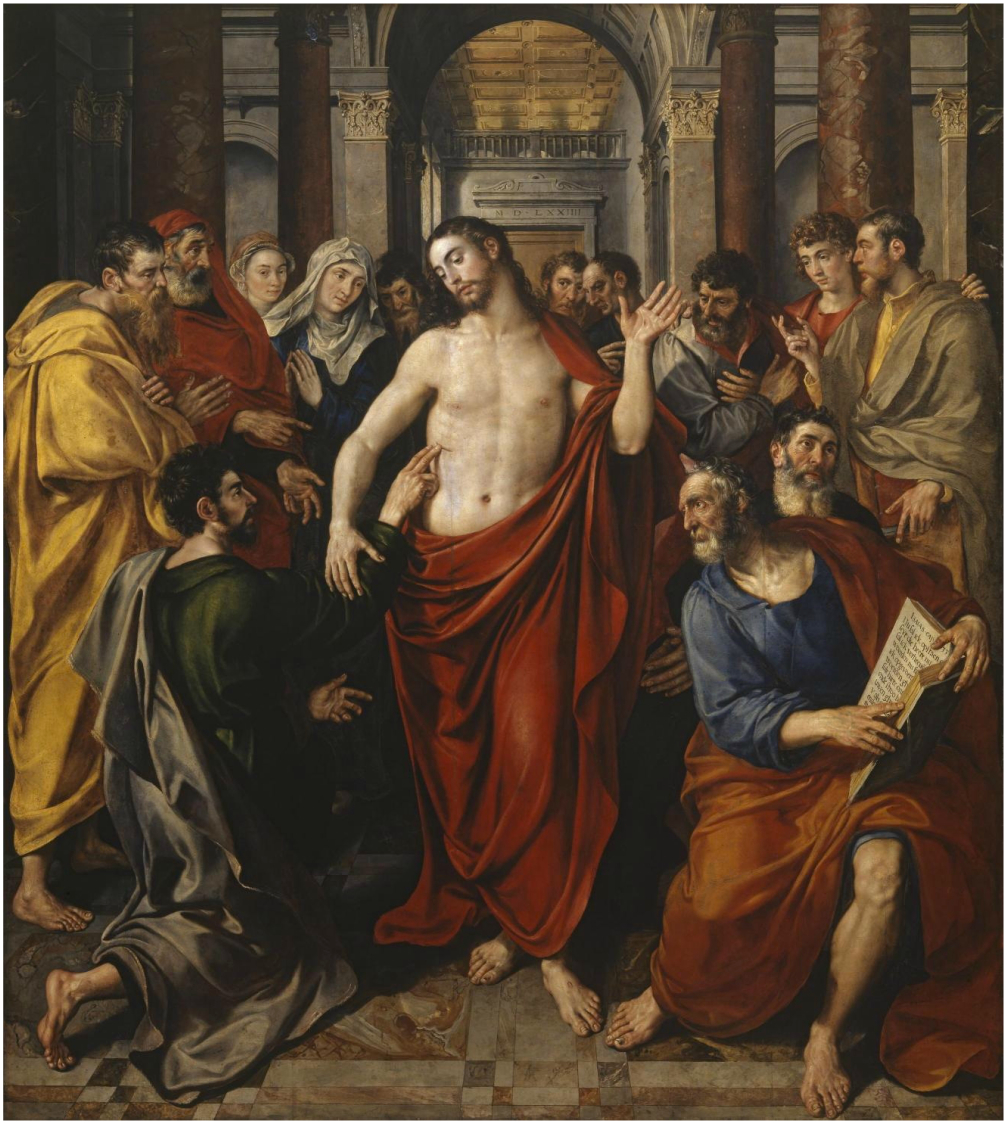
The Incredulity of Thomas, 1574

He was born in Antwerp as the youngest of the four children of Peter (Pieter or Peerke) de Vos, (born in Leiden in 1490), and Anna de Heere. His father was recorded in the registers of the Antwerp Guild of Saint Luke in 1507 as a pupil studying painting under Jeroom Scuelens and in 1519 as a free master. Maerten's mother was a daughter of the Antwerp painter Marten (Maerten) de Heere who was registered in 1498 as a free master of the Antwerp Guild of Saint Luke.

Temptation of Saint Anthony, 1594

Maerten de Vos first trained, along his brother Pieter, under the guidance of their father. Some art historians have speculated that he then continued his studies with Frans Floris, the leading Antwerp history painter of the mid-16th century, but there is no documentary evidence for this. As a trip to Italy had become a rite of passage for Flemish artists in the 16th century, de Vos travelled to Italy where he resided between 1550 and 1558. It is possible that he made at least part of his trip to Italy in the company of Pieter Brueghel the Elder. He likely resided in Rome, Florence and Venice. De Vos' work shows a strong influence of the colors of the Venetians. The 17th-century Italian artist biographer Carlo Ridolfi wrote that de Vos worked in the studio of Tintoretto in Venice, which would explain this influence.

Upon his return to Antwerp in 1558 de Vos became a free master of the Antwerp Guild of Saint Luke. It is possible that he returned to Antwerp earlier if the date of 1556 on a portrait painting is correct. He married Joanna le Boucq, whose family was originally from Valenciennes in France. The couple had five daughters and three sons. At the time, Frans Floris and his large workshop fulfilled most of the demand for history painting in Antwerp, making it difficult for other artists to find commissions. De Vos was lucky to obtain in 1564 commissions from the rich Antwerp merchant Gillis Hooftman.

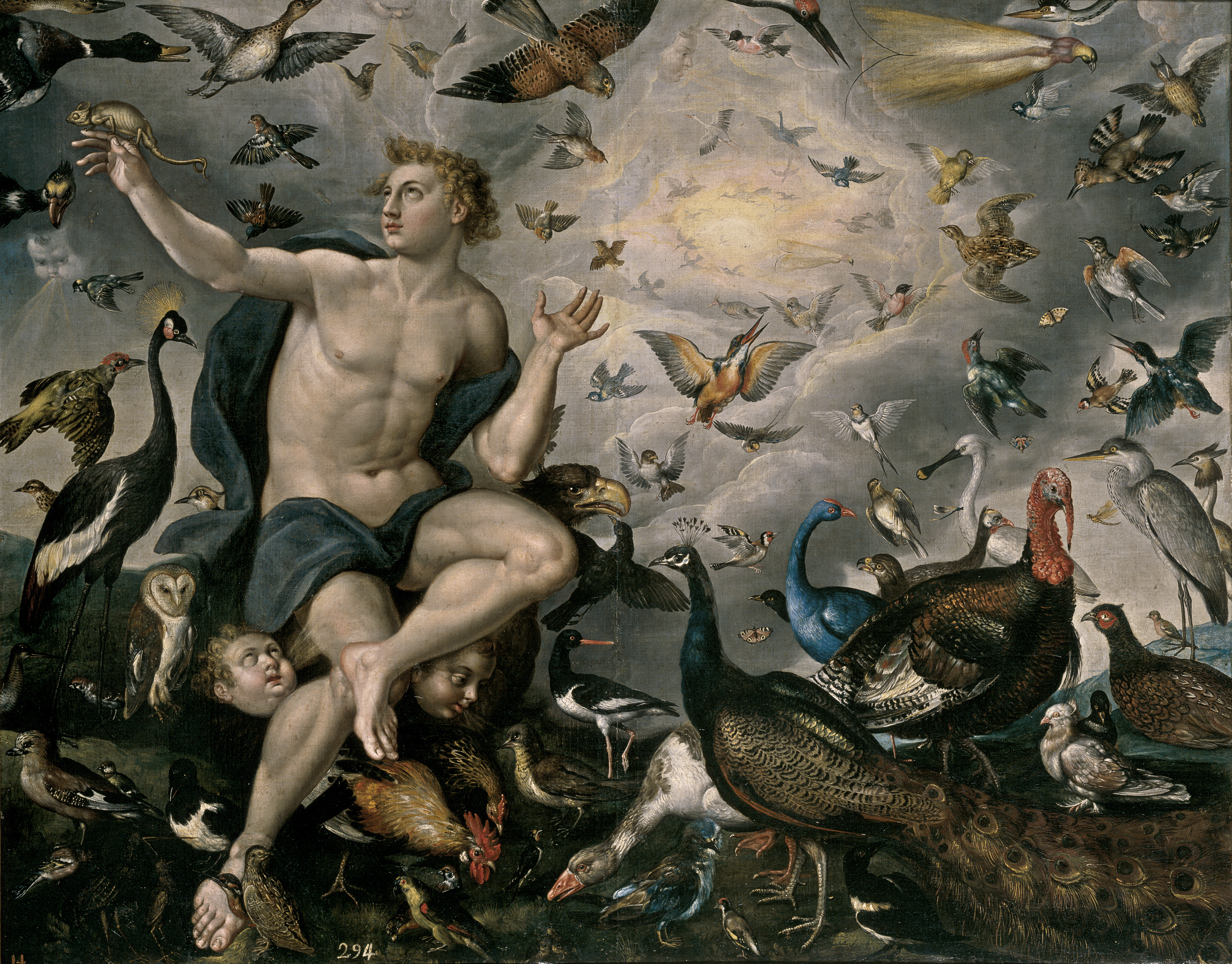
Allegory of Air

In the 1560s an iconoclastic fury referred to in Dutch as the Beeldenstorm (Dutch for 'attack on the images or statues') raged in Flanders and reached its peak in 1566. Catholic art and many forms of church fittings and decoration were destroyed by nominally Calvinist Protestant crowds in the name of the Protestant Reformation. Floris never recovered from the shock of seeing his artworks destroyed, and soon found himself in a downward spiral in both his personal and professional affairs. He virtually stopped painting after 1566, and a younger generation of artists seized the opportunity to take over his important position in history painting in the Habsburg Netherlands. Among these artists Maerten de Vos became the most prominent.

De Vos received in 1570 the commission to decorate the palatine chapel of William, Duke of Brunswick-Lüneburg in Celle, Germany. His reputation grew and in 1572 he was appointed dean of the Antwerp guild. De Vos had initially converted to the Lutheran faith, but he reconverted to Catholicism after the Fall of Antwerp and the defeat of the Protestant cause in the Habsburg Netherlands. His career took off as he was awarded important commissions from the brotherhoods and guilds of Antwerp. De Vos executed monumental altarpieces in the Antwerp Cathedral and other Antwerp churches. De Vos was deacon of the Antwerp Guild of Saint Luke in 1572–1573.

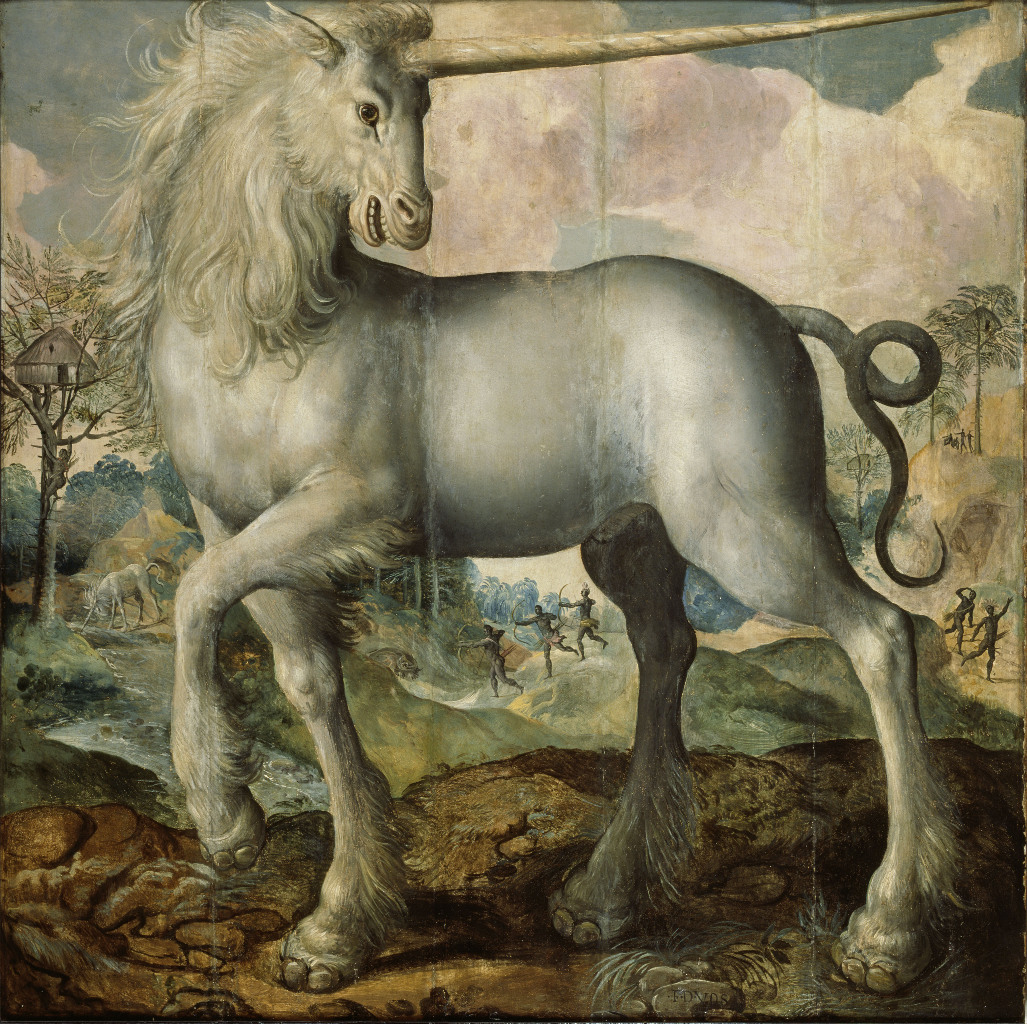
Unicorn

In 1589 De Vos and Ambrosius Francken I were appointed by the Ghent magistrate to value the painting of the Last Judgment by Raphael Coxie. Their ruling would settle a dispute between the magistrate, who had commissioned the painting, and Coxie, who felt that the sum offered to him was too low for his masterpiece. De Vos and Francken were also chosen as the chief designers of the decorations for the 1594 Joyous Entry into Antwerp of the newly appointed governor of the Southern Netherlands, Archduke Ernest of Austria. De Vos was further one of the founders of the Guild of Romanists, which was established in 1572 in Antwerp's Cathedral of Our Lady. The Guild brought together artists, connoisseurs and humanists who had travelled to Rome and appreciated humanist culture. The diversity of the membership offered artists a good opportunity to network with potential patrons. To meet the strong demand for his work, including from foreign patrons, de Vos developed a streamlined workshop practice.

Maerten de Vos had 11 pupils between 1564 and 1599: Balten Vlierden (1564), Wenzel Coebergher (1573), Hans Snyers (1575), Merten Boly (1577), Jaeckes Keerel (1577), Jan Adriansen Cnottaert (1584), Peeter Goutsteen (1588), Hans Cnottaert (1594), Hans van Alten (1595), Hans de La Torte (1595) and Abraham van Lievendale (1599). His two sons Daniel de Vos (1568–1605) and Maerten de Vos the Younger became painters but their work is hardly known.

He died in Antwerp on 4 December 1603 and was buried on 7 December in the cathedral.

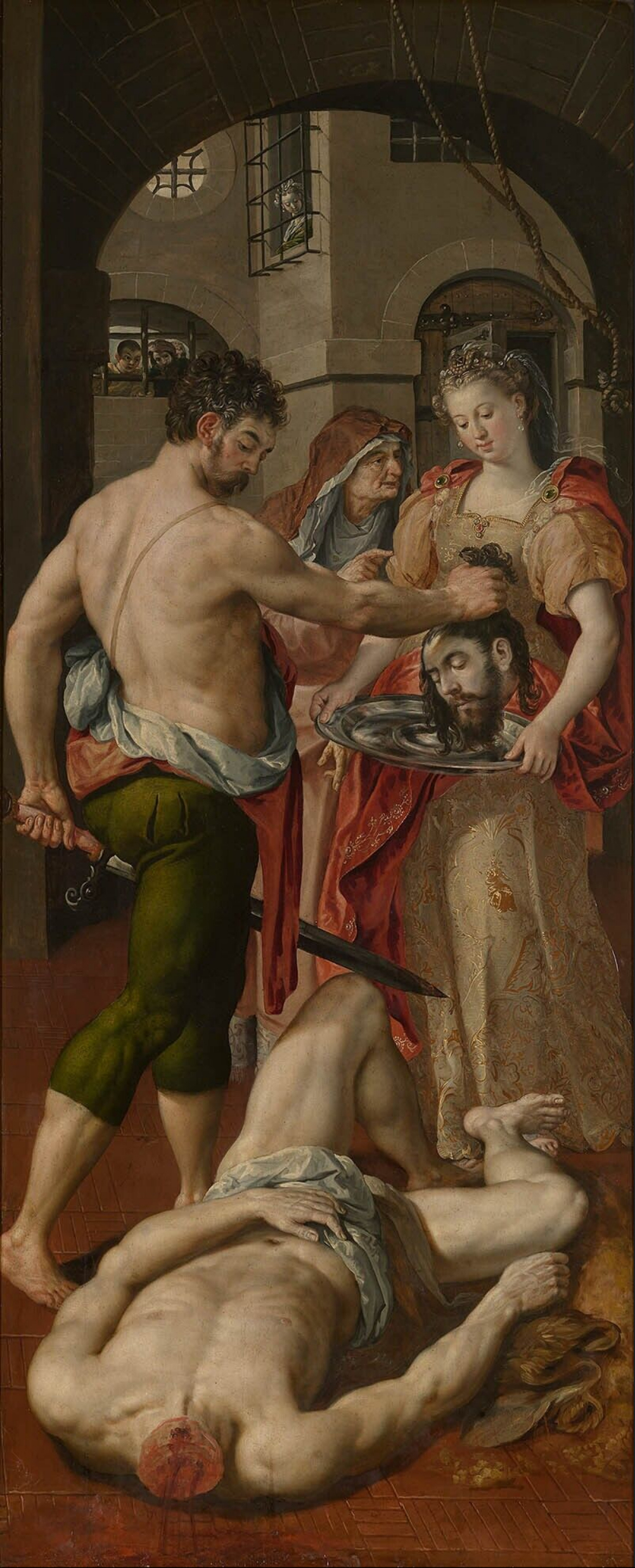
The beheading of St. John the Baptist

== Work ==
=== General ===
Maerten de Vos was principally a painter of religious scenes and to a lesser extent of mythological and allegorical themes. He was also an accomplished portrait painter. In the 1580s he produced multiple designs for prints and book illustrations. Beginning with Mannerism, his style evolved to become clear and descriptive, which perfectly corresponded to the ideas of the Counter-Reformation.

His brother Pieter de Vos was also a painter and some works previously attributed to Maerten de Vos have tentatively been re-attributed to this brother or a so-called pseudo-de Vos. The so-called Marten de Vos Sketchbook (c. 1560; Rijksmuseum, Amsterdam) containing copies of earlier drawings of Classical works of art has now been attributed to the circle of Frans Floris.

=== Paintings ===
Following the iconoclastic depredations of the Beeldenstorm, which climaxed in 1566 and resulted in the destruction of a large portion of the art in Flanders' churches, de Vos became one of the artists tasked with redecorating the plundered churches with new altarpieces. Many of these, such as St. Luke Painting the Virgin (1602), painted for the altar of the Guild of St. Luke at the Cathedral of Our Lady in Antwerp (now in the Royal Museum of Fine Arts Antwerp) to replace one on the same subject painted by Quinten Metsys and destroyed more than 20 years before, and the Marriage at Cana (1597), painted for the wine merchants guild, were commissioned by leading Antwerp organisations.

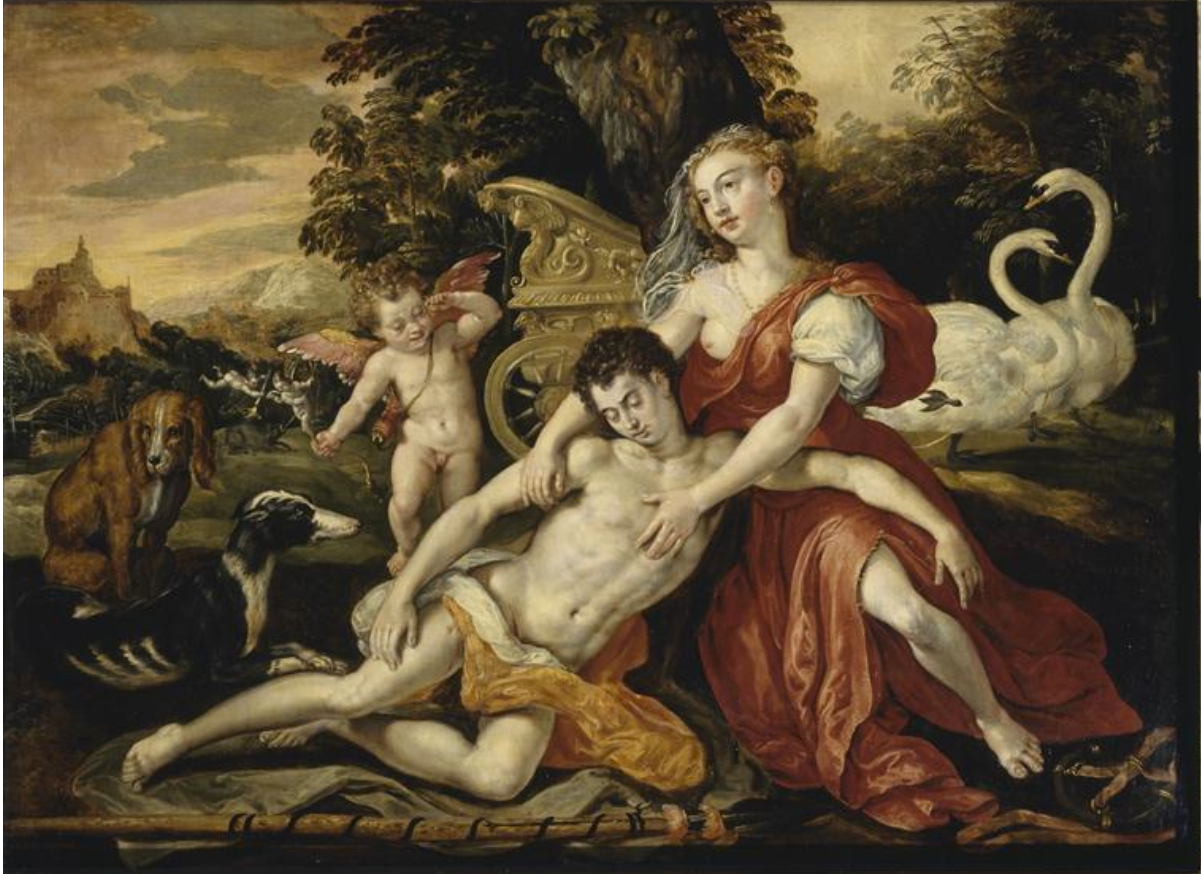
The Death of Adonis

Maerten de Vos was not an innovative artist but rather an eclectic figure who borrowed liberally from Italian masters. His work was variously indebted to one or more of the Italian painters Veronese, Tintoretto and Michelangelo, as well as to Flemish painters such as the Master of the Prodigal Son, Pieter Aertsen, and the Flemish painters influenced by Italian art referred to as Romanists such as Lambert Lombard, Frans Floris and Michiel Coxie.

His style was very recognizable and his iconography and subject matter were in a distinctly Contra-Reformation vein. While there was little evolution in his style his late altarpieces recall the work of earlier Netherlandish masters, such as Maarten van Heemskerck and, in the case of the St. Luke Painting the Virgin, Quinten Metsys. In this late period his palette became softer and more tonal.

=== Prints and drawings ===
De Vos was a very prolific 'inventor' and his large output was popularized and widely disseminated through engravings made by Raphael Sadeler, Wierix brothers and others.

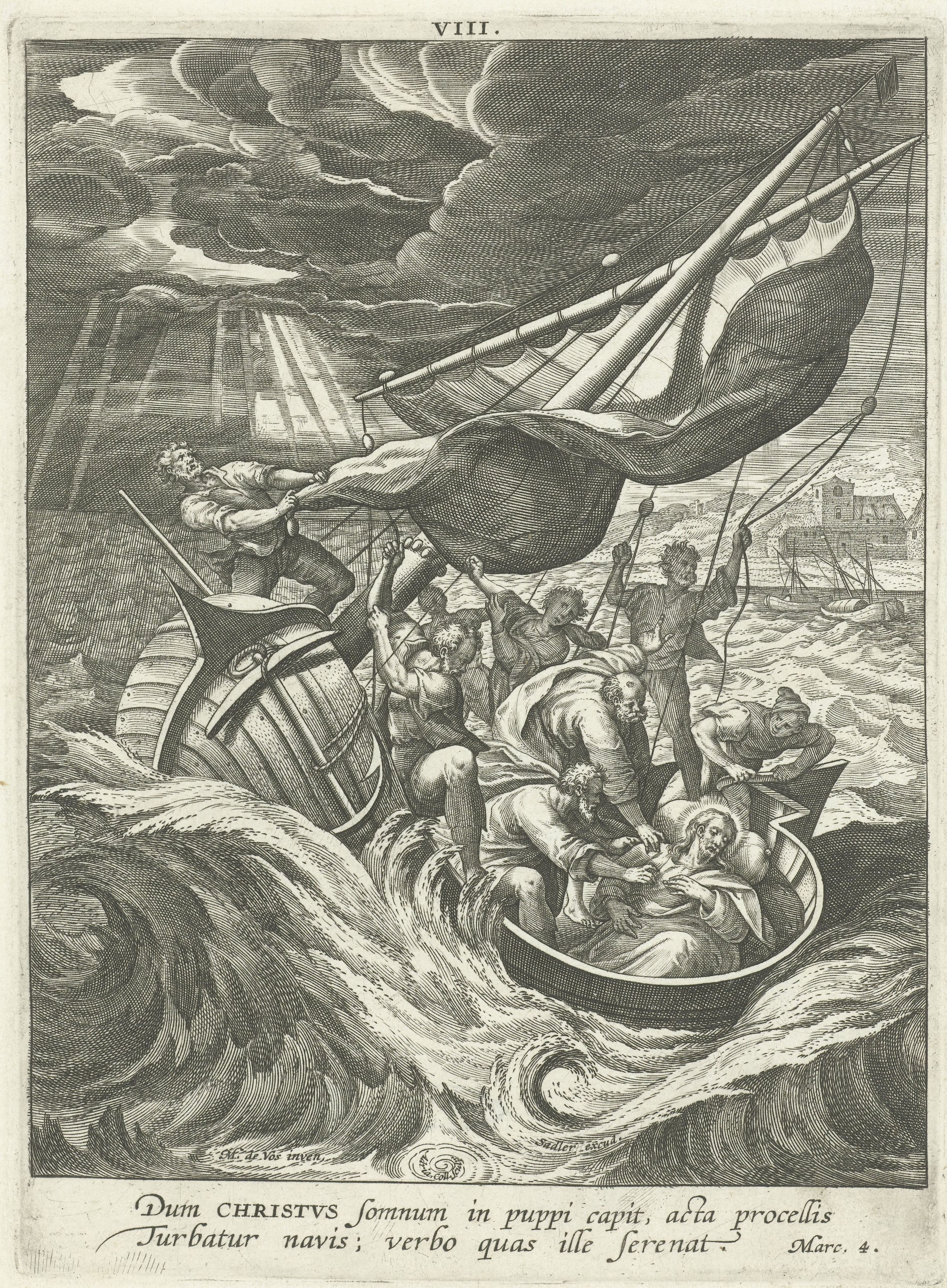
Christ sleeping during the storm

De Vos also made designs for the Antwerp publishers Plantin Press. These included designs for the Breviarium Romanum and the Missale Romanum. He also designed the illustrations for the 'Triumphus martyrum', a series of 13 prints showing martyrs of the Old Testament. Other publications on which he worked included series on the five senses, the seven deadly sins, the Christian virtues, the 12 months, the four seasons and the seven wonders of the world. De Vos provided 78 drawings for the illustrated Bible Thesaurus veteris et novi testamenti published in 1585 by Gerard de Jode. The export of this illustrated Bible by de Jode, as well as its publication in Amsterdam in a revised edition, contributed to the popularity of de Vos' illustrations throughout Europe.

His designs were engraved by leading engravers in Antwerp and published by the local presses including Pieter Balten, Frans van Beusecom, Volcxken Diericx, Adriaen Collaert, Philip Galle, Willem van Haecht, Eduard van Hoeswinkel, Gerard de Jode, Hans van Luyck and Johannes Baptista Vrints. Roughly 1600 prints were created after designs by de Vos. These were circulated widely in Europe and the colonies (and were further adapted by Greek, Mughal Indian, Chinese, and possibly Iranian artists) and contributed to his international reputation and influence. A print representing the biblical story of Christ sleeping during the storm engraved by Adriaen Collaert after a design by de Vos was likely the inspiration for Rembrandt's treatment of the same subject in The Storm on the Sea of Galilee. The print was plate 8 in the 12-part Vita, passio et Resvrrectio Iesv Christ which was published by Jan and Raphael Sadeler in Antwerp in 1583. Rembrandt's painting follows the portrait format in its composition and also depicts the boat in a forward tilting position. Like in the print, most of the space of Rembrandt's work is taken up by the main motif, which is the disciples on the boat struggling against the elements. The Dutch painter Simon de Vlieger was also inspired by the print for his treatment of the same subject (1637, Art Collection of the University Göttingen). De Vlieger depicts the boat in a forward tilting position but he distances himself from the print by integrating the story into the seascape rather than solely focusing on the activities on the boat.

De Vos' drawings are known for their lively and generally positive character. Romantic Italianate landscapes appear often in the background. His obvious proficiency led to a certain degree of routine formularization.

== See also ==
Painters who adapted works by de Vos:

- Farrukh Beg (see: Saint Jerome)
- Abu'l Hasan (see: Dialectica),
- Theodore Poulakis (see: Noah's Ark)
- Emmanuel Tzanes (see: The Incredulity of Saint Thomas)
