= Matthys Cock =

Flemish painter and draughtsman (1505–1548)

Matthijs Wellens de Cock
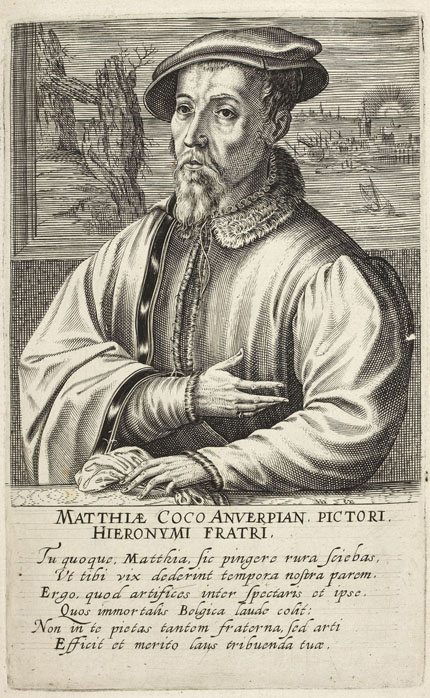
- Matthijs Cock
- Born: 1509/10, Antwerp
- Died: 1548 (aged 42–43) , Antwerp
- Known for: Painting and drawing

Matthys Cock or Matthijs Wellens de Cock (c. 1509/10 – 1540/1548) was a Flemish landscape painter and draughtsman. He is known for his landscapes, marine art and architectural drawings.

== Life ==
He was born into a family of painters. His father was the obscure painter Jan Wellens de Cock (c. 1460/1480 – in or before 1521), who was likely the Jan de Cock mentioned several times in the records of the Antwerp Guild of Saint Luke and the 'Jan Wellens, alias Cock' recorded in the aldermen's registers of Antwerp in 1492. His younger brother Hieronymus Cock (1510–1570) became a famous engraver. He is recorded as master in the guild in 1540, when he had a pupil by the name of Willeken van Santvoort. Cock may have visited Italy. He took on pupils Willem van Santvoort, Jacob Grimmer and Jan Keynooghe.

A portrait of Cock was included in the 1572 collection of portraits of early Netherlandish painters entitled Pictorum aliquot celebrium Germaniae inferioris effigies, accompanied by a poem about his landscapes written by Dominicus Lampsonius.

== Work ==
Only one signed painting of a landscape by his hand is known. He is mainly known for his drawings of landscapes. His younger brother Hieronymus engraved 13 of his landscapes and published them in 1558 under the title "Landscapes with Biblical and Mythological Scenes" (the longer Dutch title is: "Various sorts of landscapes with fine histories composed therein, from the Old and New Testaments, and several merry Poems, very convenient for painters and other connoisseurs of the arts").

Landscape with Castle above a Harbour, 1540

The early biographer Karel van Mander stated in the Schilder-boeck of 1604 that Cock was the first to bring the southern manner of landscape painting to the North. His landscapes show that he was aware of the work of Titian and the Venetian draughtsman Domenico Campagnola. He was the first to specialise in the depiction of villages and country retreats.

Cock has been suggested as one of the possible draughtsmen of the Errara sketchbook in the collection of the Royal Museums of Fine Arts of Belgium, but this attribution is not generally accepted.
