= Dirk de Waard =

Dutch-born American geologist

Dirk de Waard (5 February 1919 – 26 January 2011) was a Dutch-born American geologist. He was a professor of geology at Syracuse University.

De Waard was born in Hilversum. He was elected a correspondent of the Royal Netherlands Academy of Arts and Sciences in 1955. De Waard died in Montgomery, Texas in January 2011 at the age of 91.
