= Adriaen de Weerdt =

Dutch painter (1510-1590)

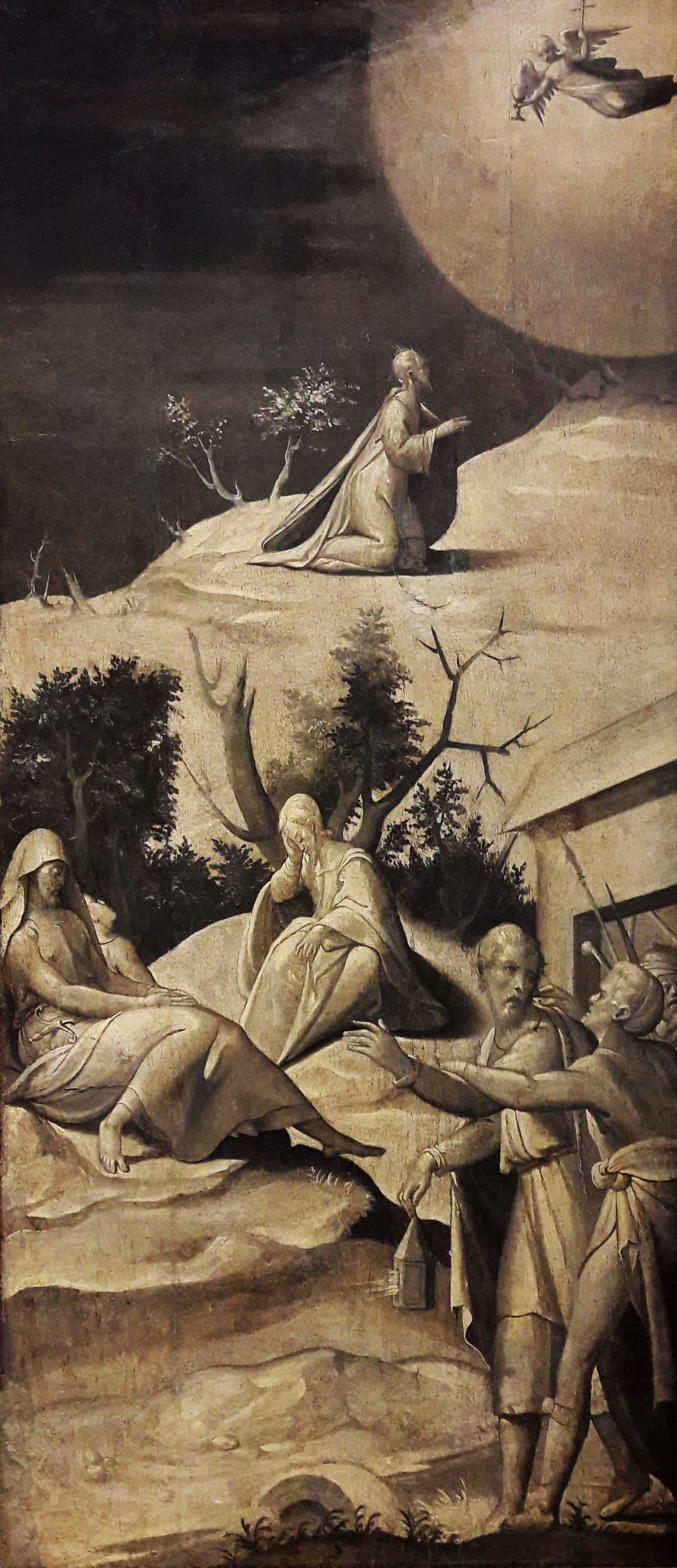
The Agony in the Garden of Gethsemane (National Museum of Warsaw)

Adriaan de Weerdt (c. 1510 in Brussels – c. 1590 in Cologne) was a Flemish Renaissance painter and engraver.

== Biography ==
According to Karel van Mander he travelled to Antwerp to learn to paint from Christian van den Queborn (whose son Daniel became a court painter in The Hague). He returned to Brussels and painted landscapes in the manner of Frans Mostaert. He then travelled to Italy to learn the works of Parmigianino (Van Mander: Parmentius) and came back home around 1566 painting in a different style altogether. He fled Antwerp with his mother due to the Dutch revolt and moved to Cologne, where he made allegorical prints, sometimes working with Dirck Volckertszoon Coornhert on emblem illustrations.

According to the RKD he was active in Italy and moved to Cologne around 1566. He is known for prints and historical allegories.

== Sources ==
- Adriaan de Weerdt on Artnet
