= Christian van den Queborn =

Flemish painter

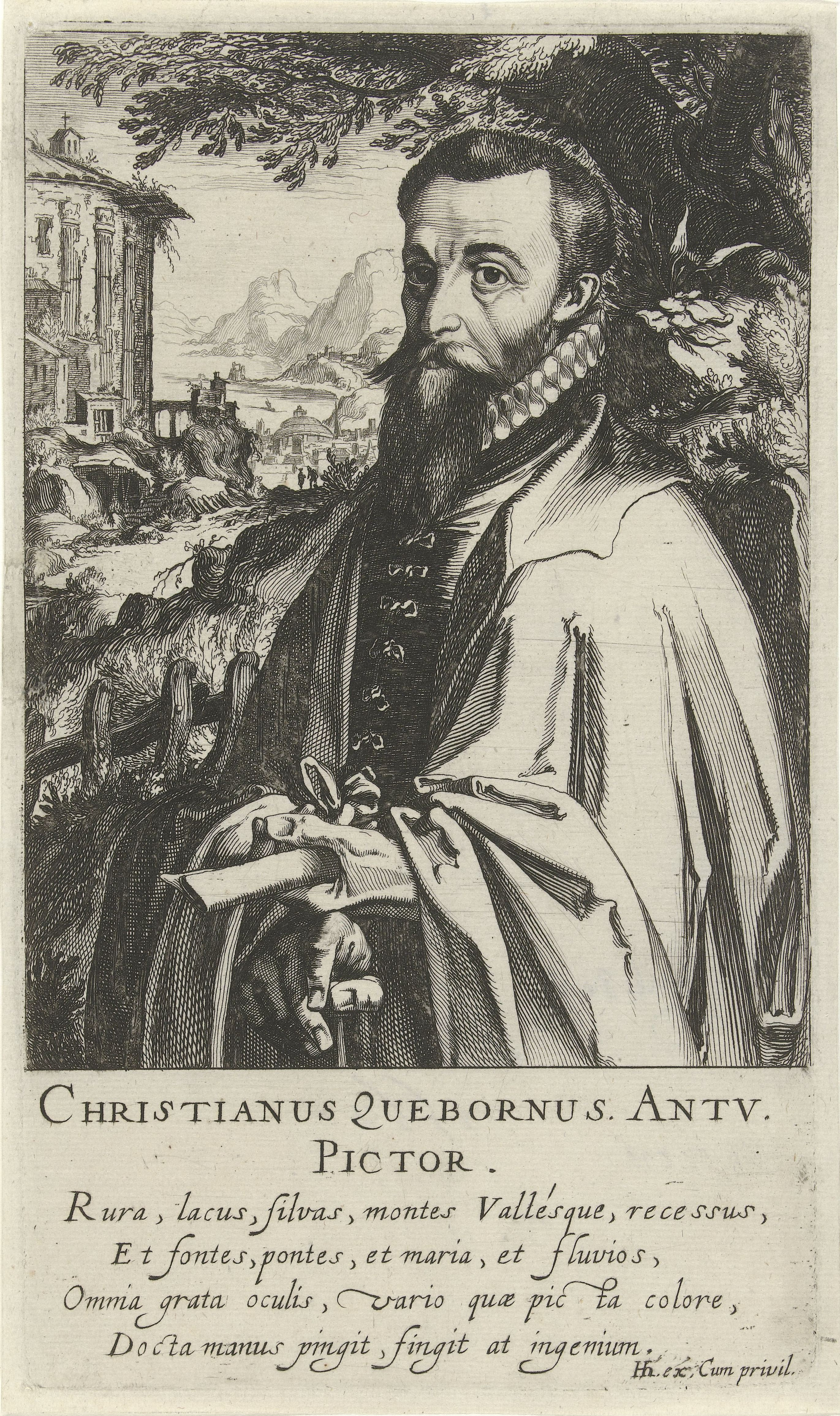
Engraved portrait of Christan van den Queborn by Simon Frisius

Christian van den Queborn (1515, Antwerp – 1578, Antwerp), was a Flemish Renaissance painter.

== Biography ==
According to the RKD he became master of the Antwerp Guild of St. Luke in 1545. He was the father of the portrait painter Daniël van den Queborn, and grandfather of the painters Crispijn van den Queborn (1604–1652) and Louis van den Queborn (died 1658).

His portrait was engraved by Simon Frisius for Hendrik Hondius I's Pictorum aliquot celebrium praecipue Germaniae inferioris Effigies.
