= Palazzo Malipiero-Trevisan =

Building in Venice, Italy

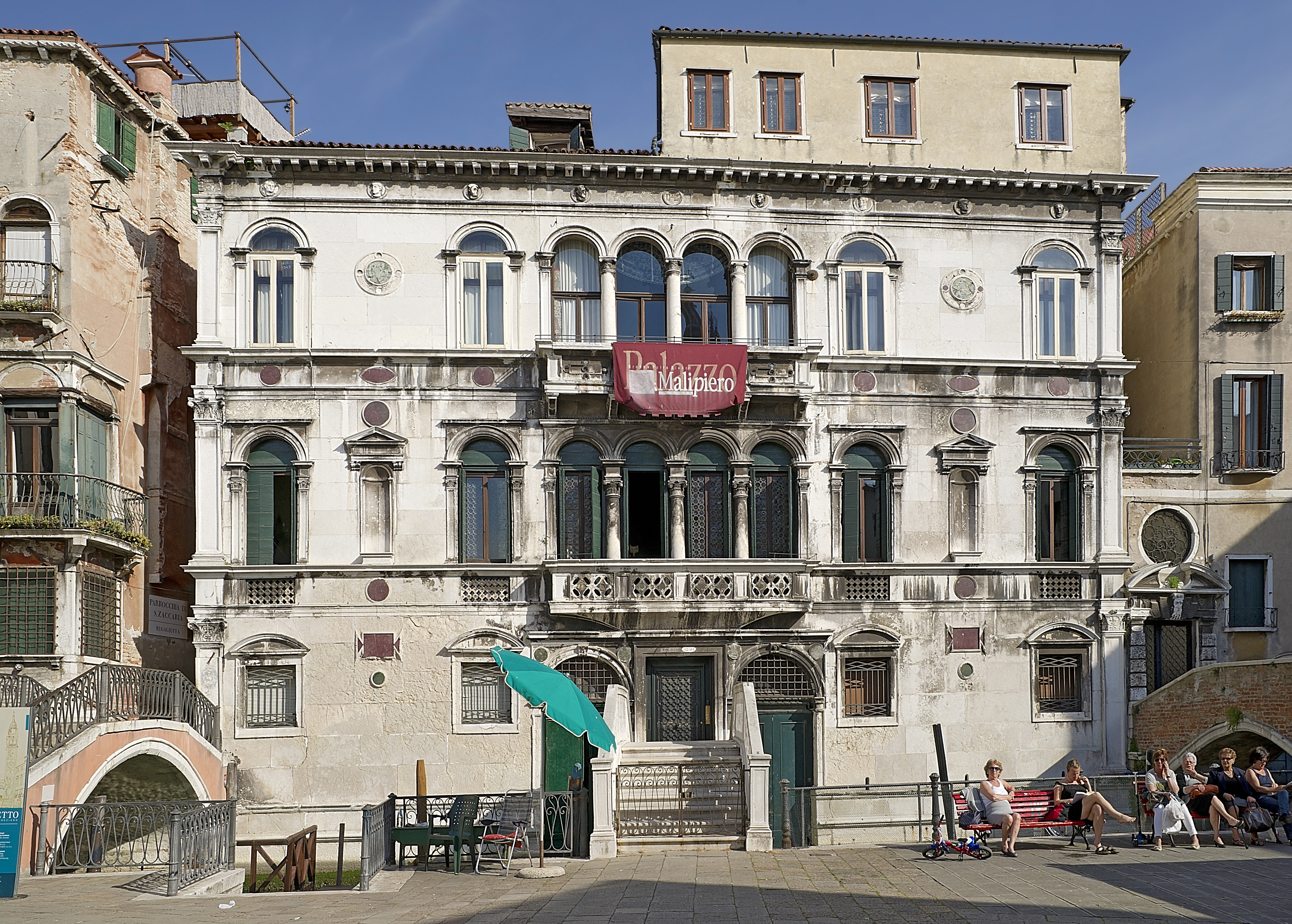
- Palazzo Malipiero-Trevisan
- Interactive map of the Palazzo Malipiero-Trevisan area

General information
- Type: Residential
- Architectural style: Renaissance
- Location: Castello district, Venice, Italy
- Coordinates: 45°26′12.5″N 12°20′29.6″E
- Renovated: 15th-16th century

Technical details
- Floor count: 3 levels

Palazzo Malipiero-Trevisan is a Renaissance palace in Venice, Italy located in the Castello district, on the south-eastern side of campo Santa Maria Formosa and separated from it by the Santa Maria Formosa river (entry is through a private bridge).

== History ==
The palace was the residence of the Malipiero family until the end of the 15th century when it passed, by marriage, to the Trevisan family. Perhaps on this occasion it was rebuilt in its present form; the project was for a long time attributed, without certain proof, to Sante Lombardo who, more likely, was only concerned with finishing its decoration. The palazzo was mentioned by Sansovino.

As time passed, the palazzo was divided in several properties, where the Diedo, the Bembo, and the Zen families lived, in addition to the Trevisans themselves. The building also hosted the famous Fracasso printing house. The palace is still divided into several apartments.

== Architecture ==
The setting of the symmetrical façade, which still preserves the original Istrian stone roof, is typically of the Venetian Renaissance architectural style. The building consists of three floors: a ground floor and two noble floors. The ground floor has two round-arched portals on the river; two noble floors of the same layout are decorated with quadriforas at the center. The quadriforas are decorated with sculpted parapets and flanked by pairs of single-light windows.

To embellish and regulate the parts of the façade, there are niches and marble discs—the latter recalling the Gothic-Byzantine style typical for the nearby Palazzo Vitturi. Inside, on the second floor, there are frescoes painted in the 18th century, still in good condition. In recent years, the palazzo has been disfigured by an asymmetric addition to its roof that is wholly unsympathetic to it.

== Gallery ==
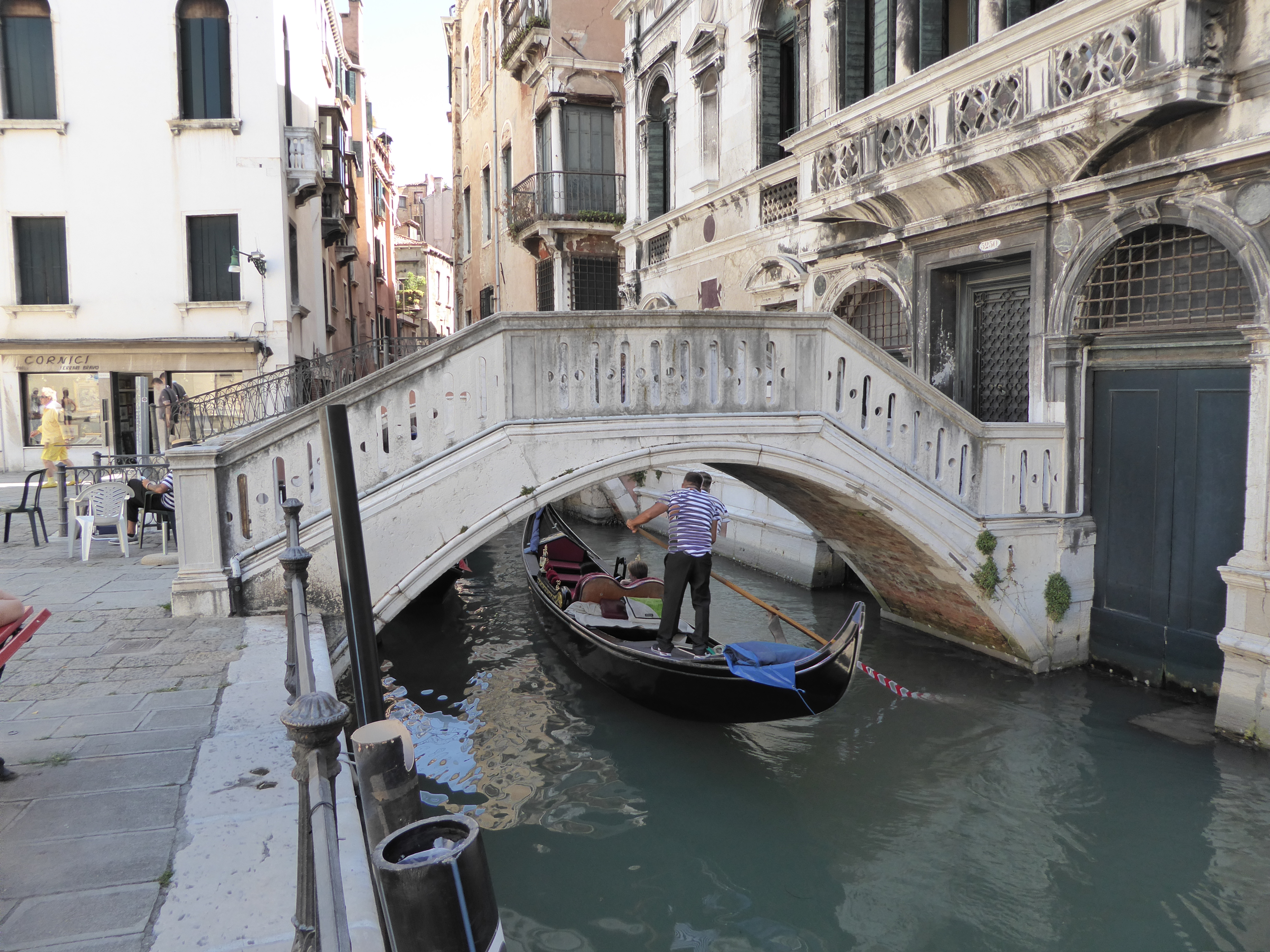
Private bridge to the palace

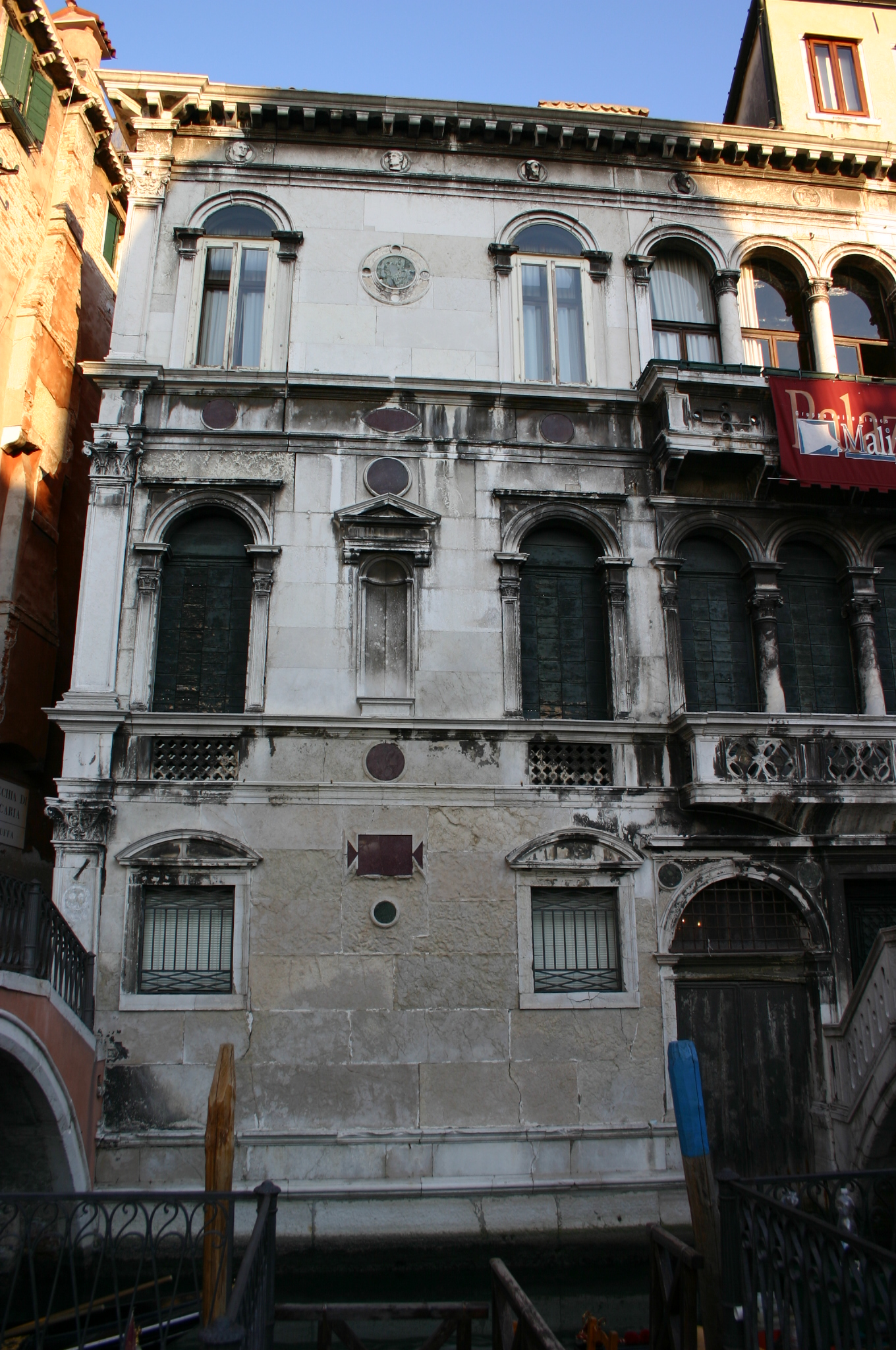
Facade details

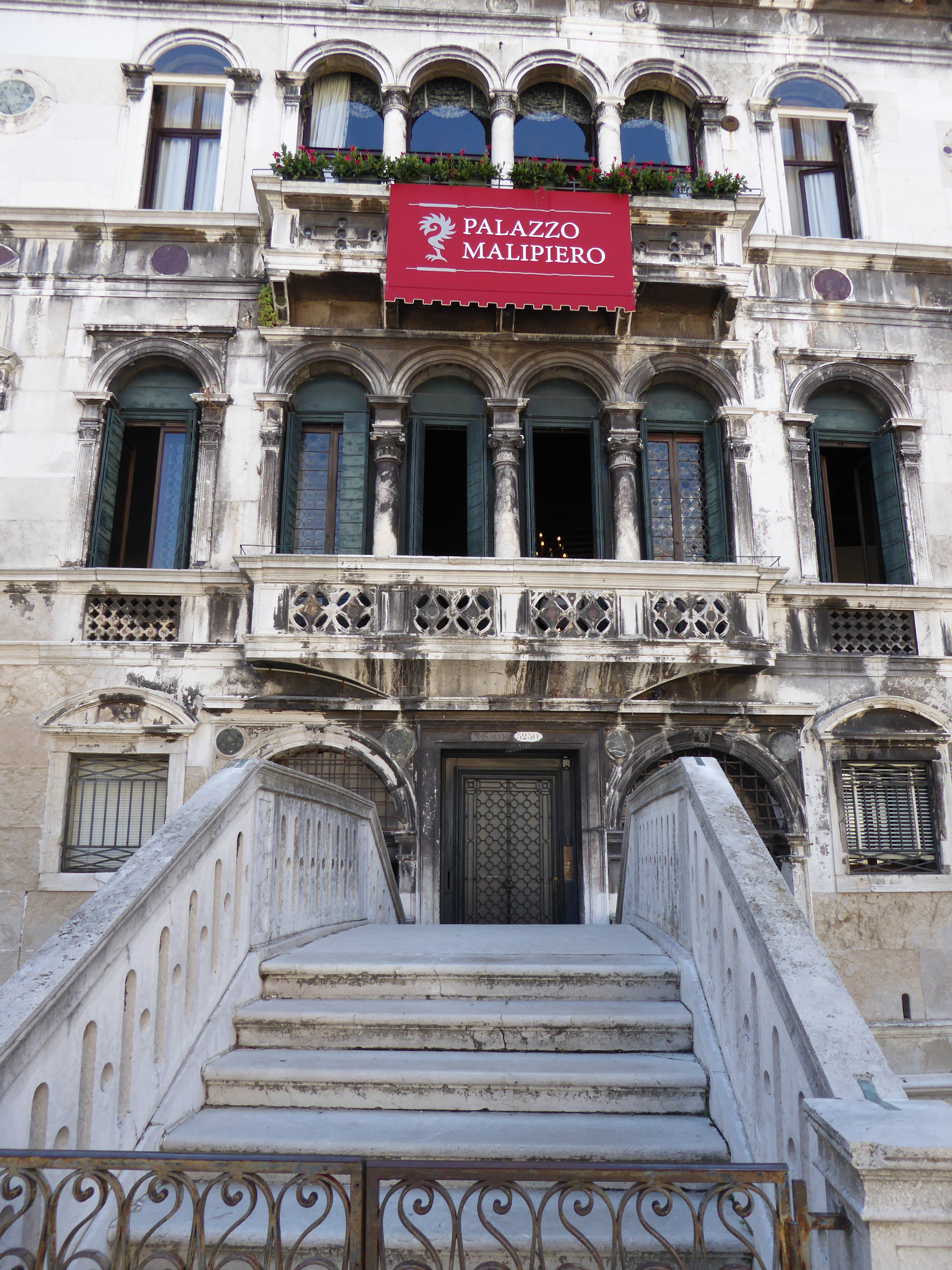
Private bridge and central portal

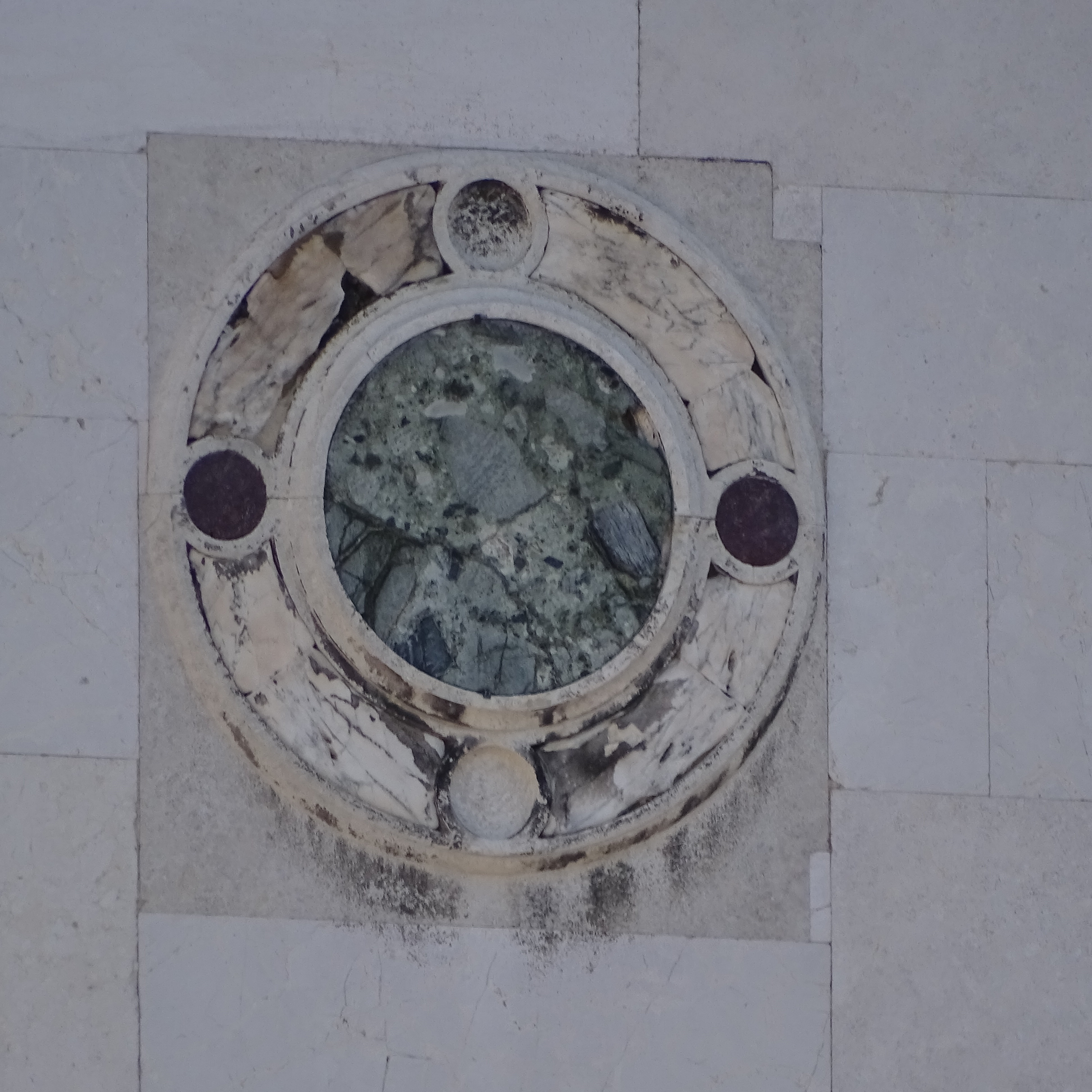
Marble disc on the facade

== See also ==
- Palazzo Malipiero
