= Francesco Pianta =

Italian sculptor

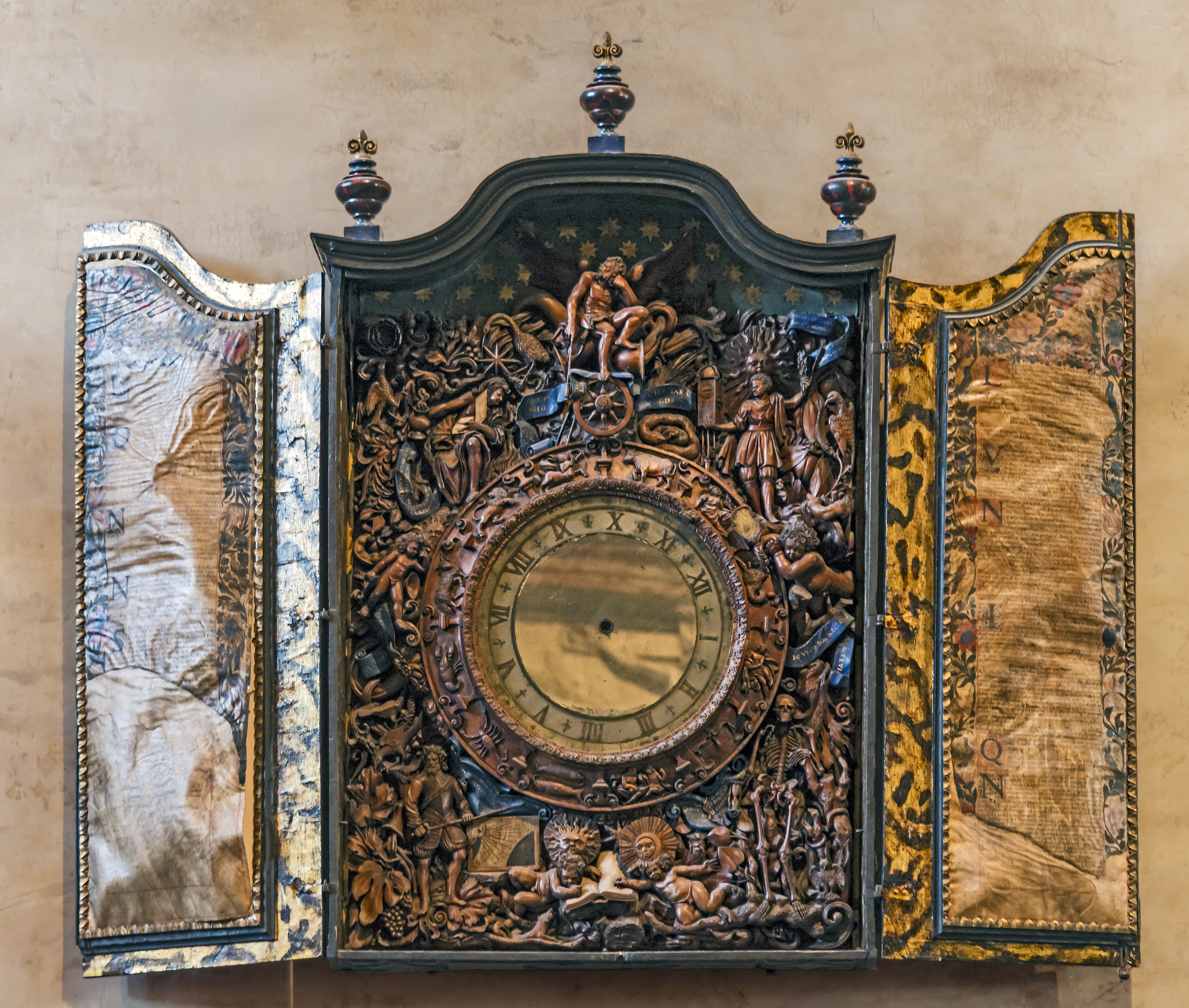
A clock made by Francesco Pianta

Francesco Pianta (1634–1692), also Francesco Pianta the Younger of Venice, was an Italian sculptor.

Pianta grew up within a family of stone carvers, and lived and worked in Venice. He primarily carved wood, and carved a series of wooden panels with allegorical figures for the Upper Hall of the Scuola Grande di San Rocco between 1657 and 1658.

Pianta was one among a group of sculptors working in Venice. They worked only with wood. Pianta was the most popular among these sculptors. The works of Pianta were known for their fanciful or bizarre themes. But he still was a sought-after sculptor, with some of the wealthiest people as his patrons. Several of his works survive today, but his most famous work is wooden panels series with allegorical secular figures housed in the hall of the Scuola Grande di San Rocco.
