= Malipiero =

Venetian surname

Malipiero is a Venetian surname of Bohemian origin, also documented as Mastropiero or Maripiero.

Malipiero can refer to:

== People ==
- Domenico Malipiero (1428–1515), Venetian naval captain
- Felicia Malipiero, Dogaressa of Venice by marriage to the Doge Pietro I Orseolo and mother of doge Pietro II Orseolo
- Francesco Malipiero (1824–1887), Italian opera composer, grandfather of Gian Francesco Malipiero
- Gian Francesco Malipiero (1882–1973), Italian composer
- Giovanni Malipiero (1906–1970), Italian tenor
- Pasquale Malipiero, called the dux pacificus (1392–1462), Venetian statesman and 66th Doge of Venice
- Riccardo Malipiero (cellist) (1886–1975), brother of Gian Francesco Malipiero
- Riccardo Malipiero (1914–2003), Italian composer and pianist, son of cellist Riccardo Malipiero, nephew of Gian Francesco Malipiero

== Locations ==
- Palazzo Malipiero, a palace in Venice, Italy.
- Palazzo Malipiero-Trevisan
