= Sante Lombardo =

Italian architect (1504–1560)

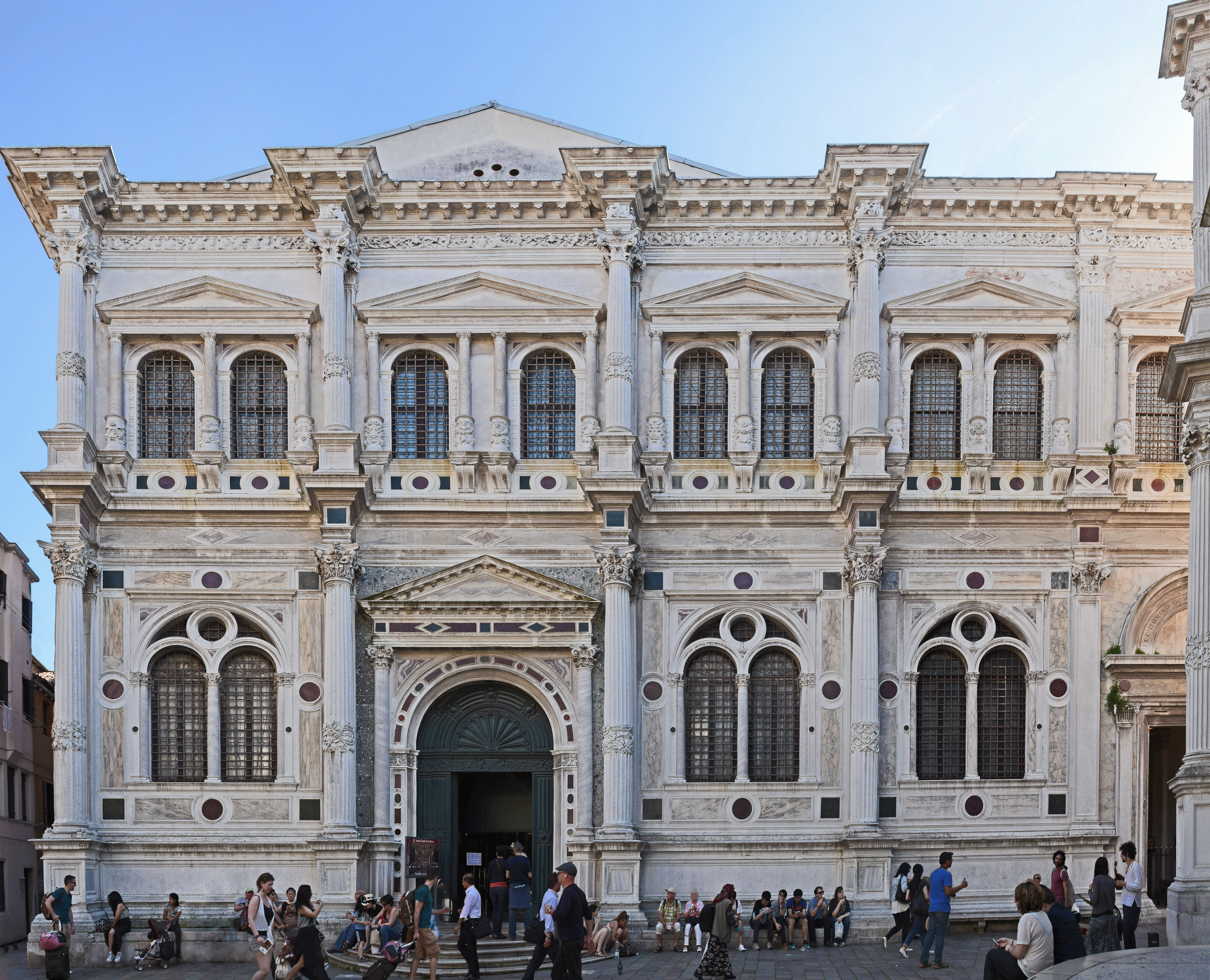
Facade of Scuola Grande di San Rocco.

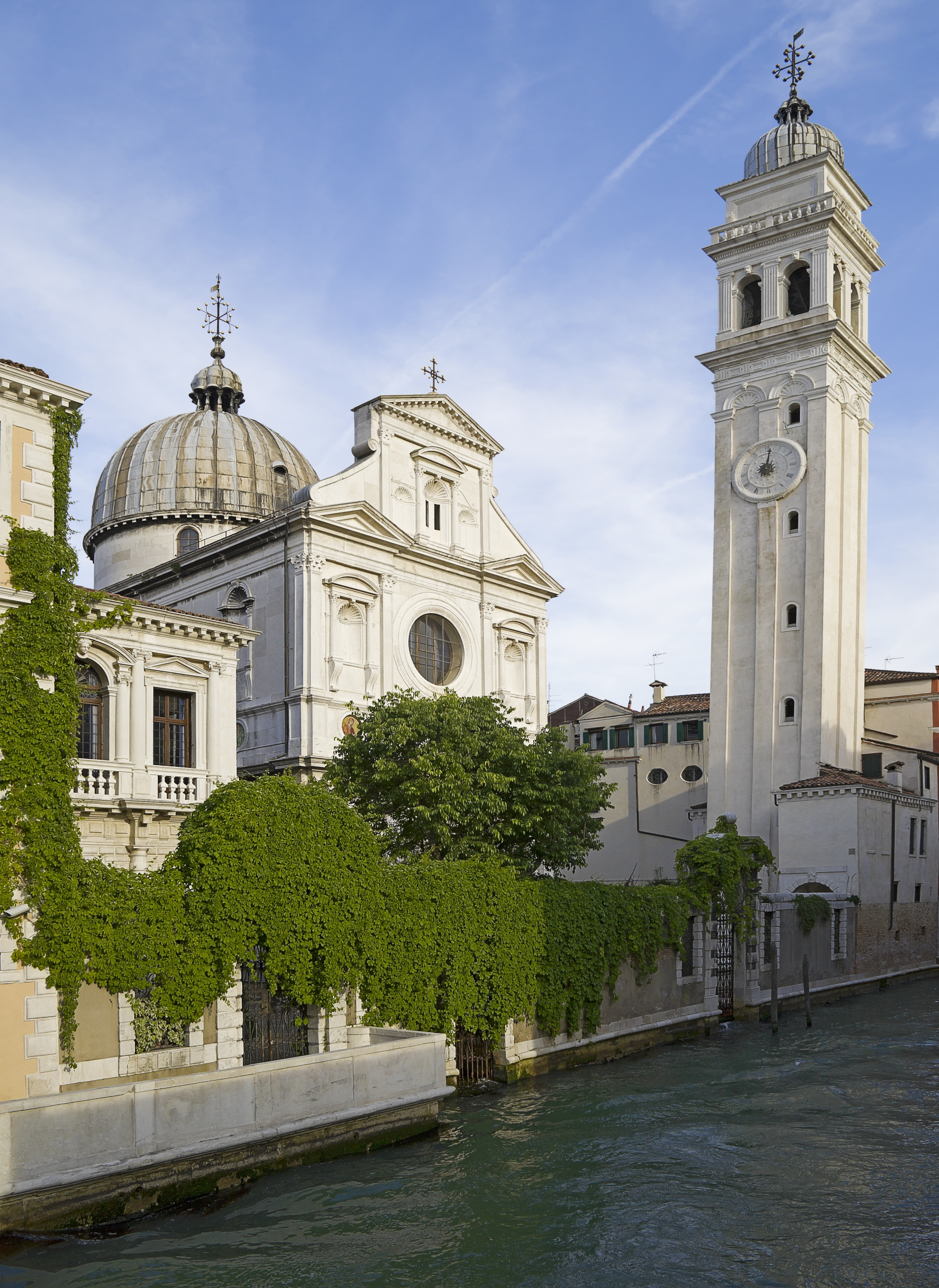
The church of San Giorgio dei Greci.

Sante Lombardo (1504–1560) was an Italian architect.

== Biography ==
He was born in Venice, the son of Tullio Lombardo. It is mentioned for the first time in sources in 1534, when he was appointed protomastro of the Scuola Grande di San Rocco in Venice (under the supervision of his father), for which he provided the internal and external decoration.

In 1535 he received a contract for an altar in the church of San Felice; he probably contributed to the latter's reconstruction in 1551–1556. Later Lombard took in part in the construction of Palazzo Malipiero-Trevisan.

In 1536 he designed the new church of San Giorgio dei Greci, for which he led the construction work until 1548.

He died in 1560 in Venice.

== Sources ==
- Blake Mc Ham, S. (1996). "Sante Lombardo". The Dictionary of Art. New York. pp. 560–561.
