= Scuola Grande di San Rocco =

Building in Venice, Italy

Coordinates: 45.4366°N 12.325°E

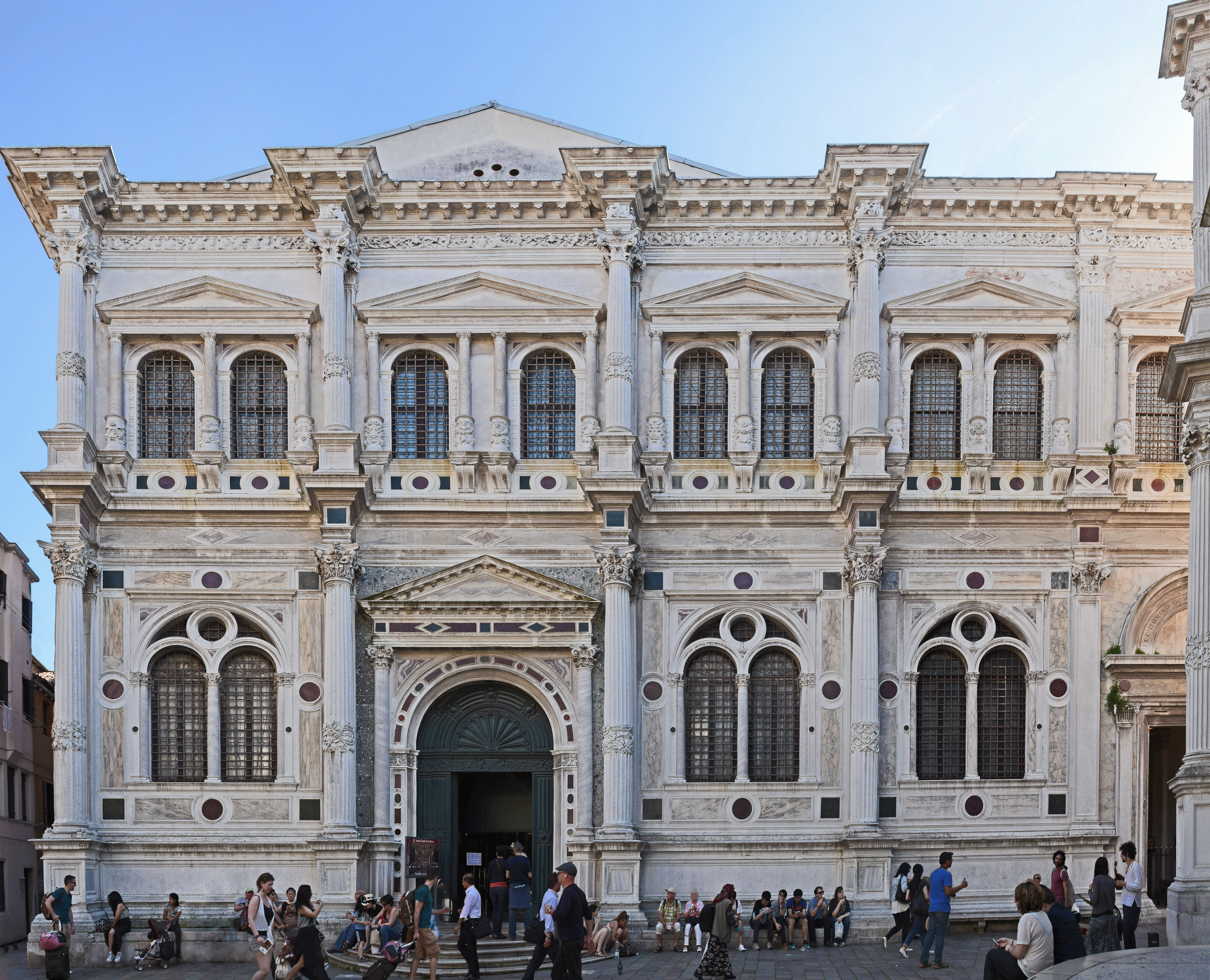
Facade on Campo San Rocco

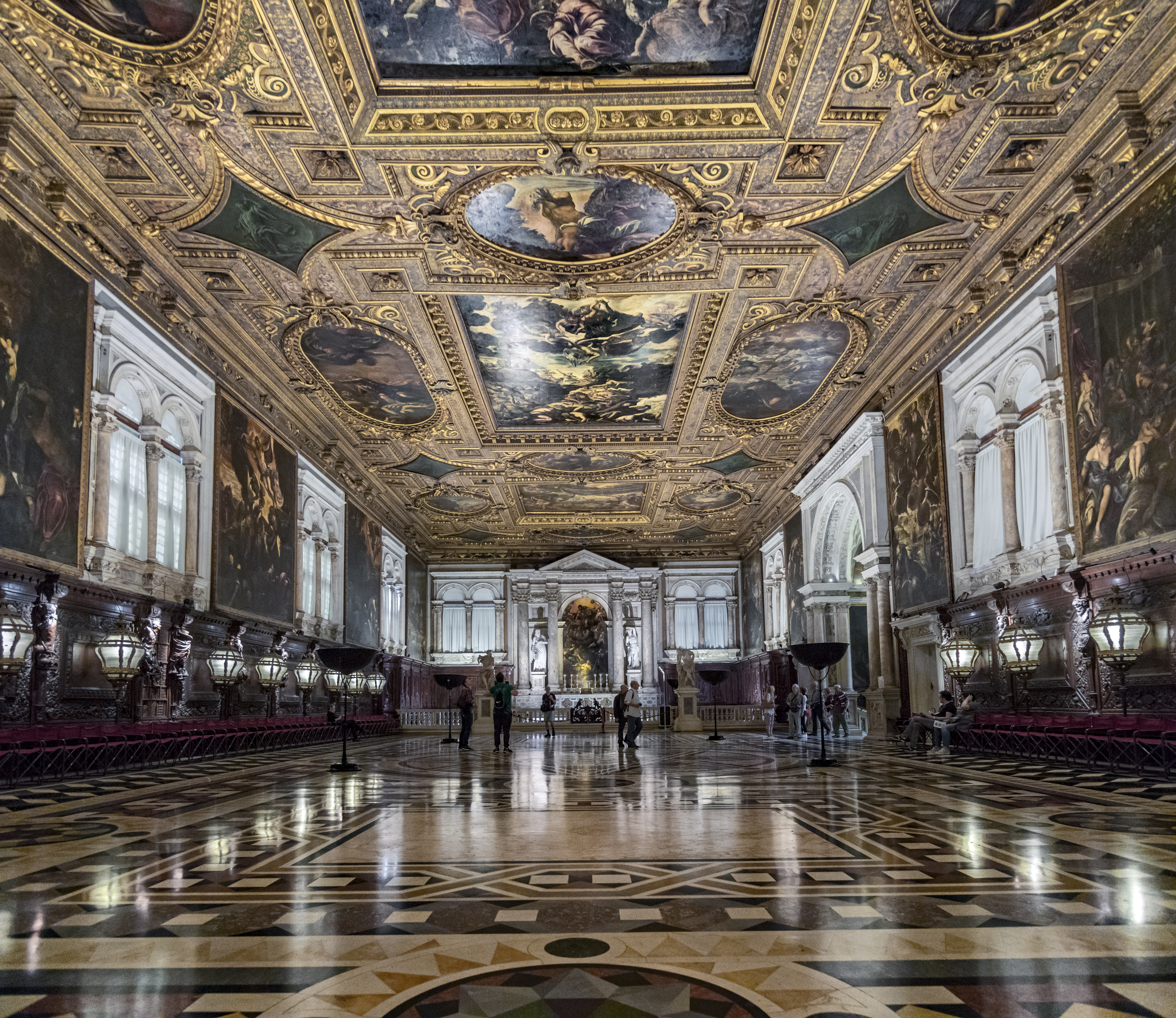
Salone Maggiore

The Scuola Grande di San Rocco is a building in Venice, northern Italy. It is noted for its collection of paintings by Tintoretto and generally agreed to include some of his finest work.

== History ==
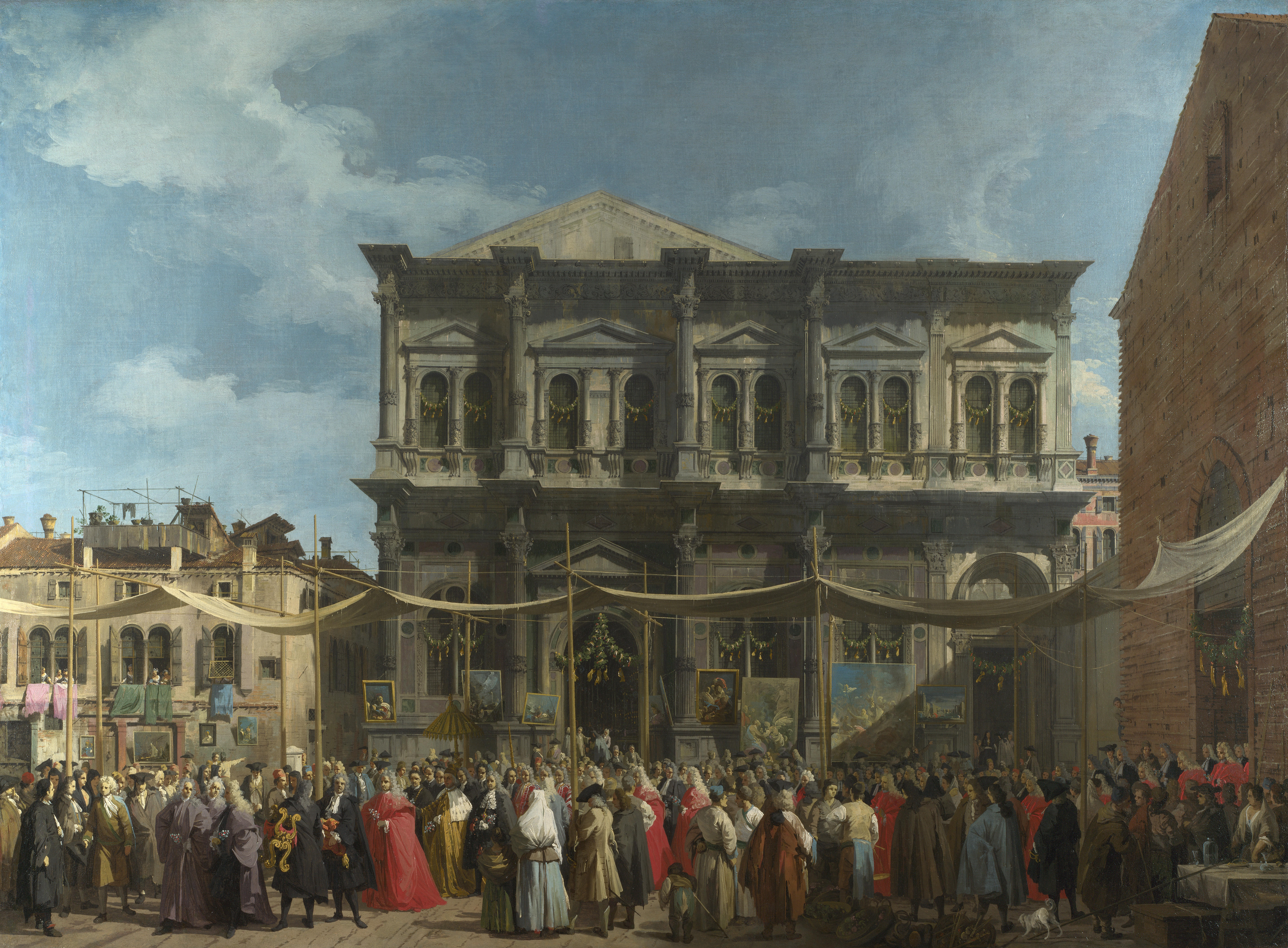
The Feast Day of Saint Roch by Canaletto, 1735

The building is the seat of a confraternity established in 1478, named after San Rocco, popularly regarded as a protector against plague. The members of the "Confraternity of St. Roch" were a group of wealthy Venetian citizens. The site they chose for their building is next to the church of San Rocco which houses the relics of the saint.

In January 1515 the project of the building was entrusted to Pietro Bon. In 1524 his work was continued by Sante Lombardo, who, in turn, three years later was replaced by Antonio Scarpagnino. Following his death in 1549, the last architect to work on the edifice was Giangiacomo dei Grigi, finishing in September 1560.

The design was similar to other scuole in Venice, characterized by two halls, one at ground floor level, the other at first floor level. The Sala Terra (lower) has a nave and two aisles, with the entrance from the campo outside. From this hall a stair (with a landing surmounted by a dome) led to the upper storey. The Sala Superiore ("Upper Hall") was used for meetings of the fellows and had a wooden altar. It provided access to the Sala dell'Albergo, which housed the Banca and the Zonta (the confraternity's supervisory boards).

== Art ==
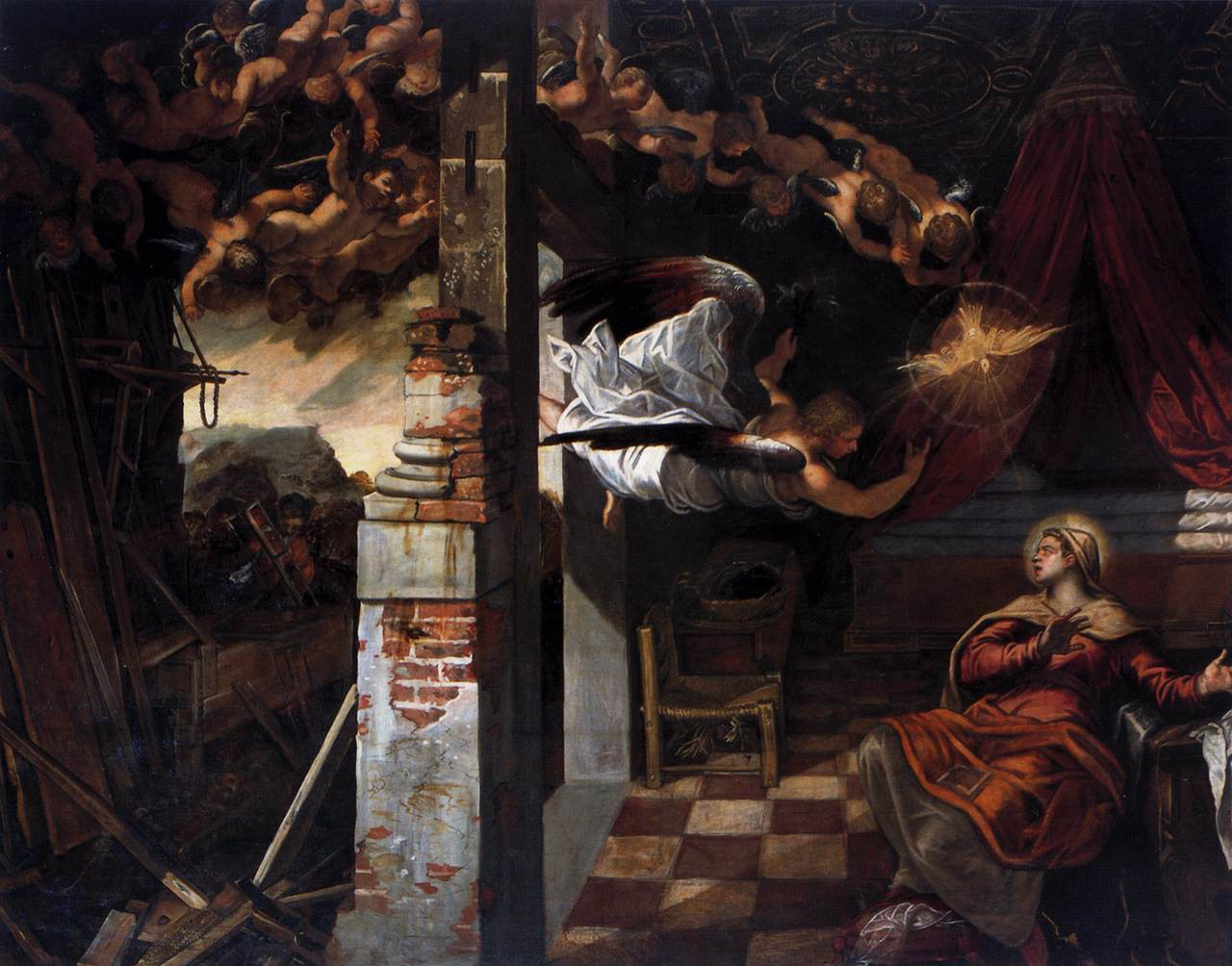
The Annunciation from the Tintoretto cycle

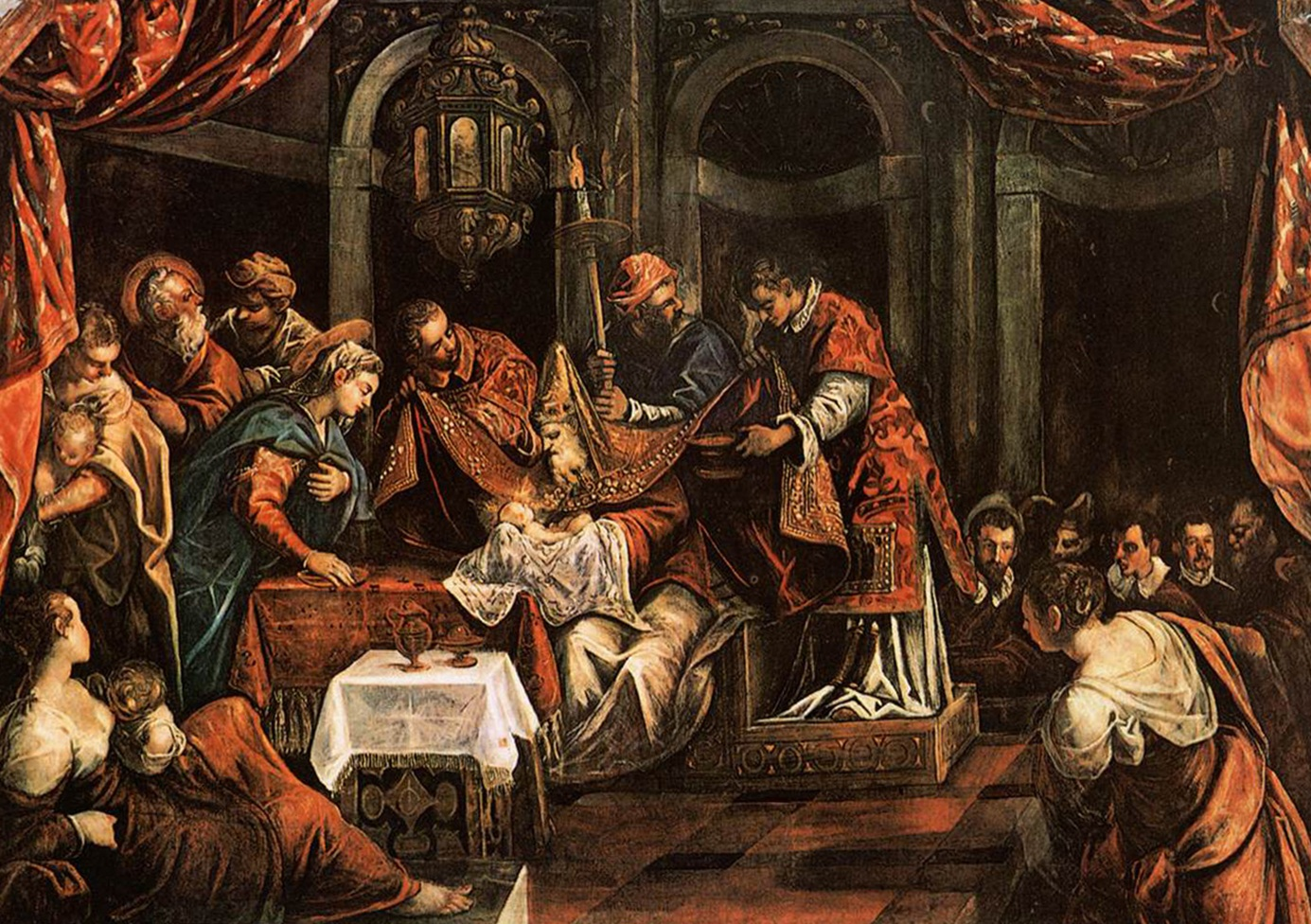
The Circumcision of Jesus from the Tintoretto cycle

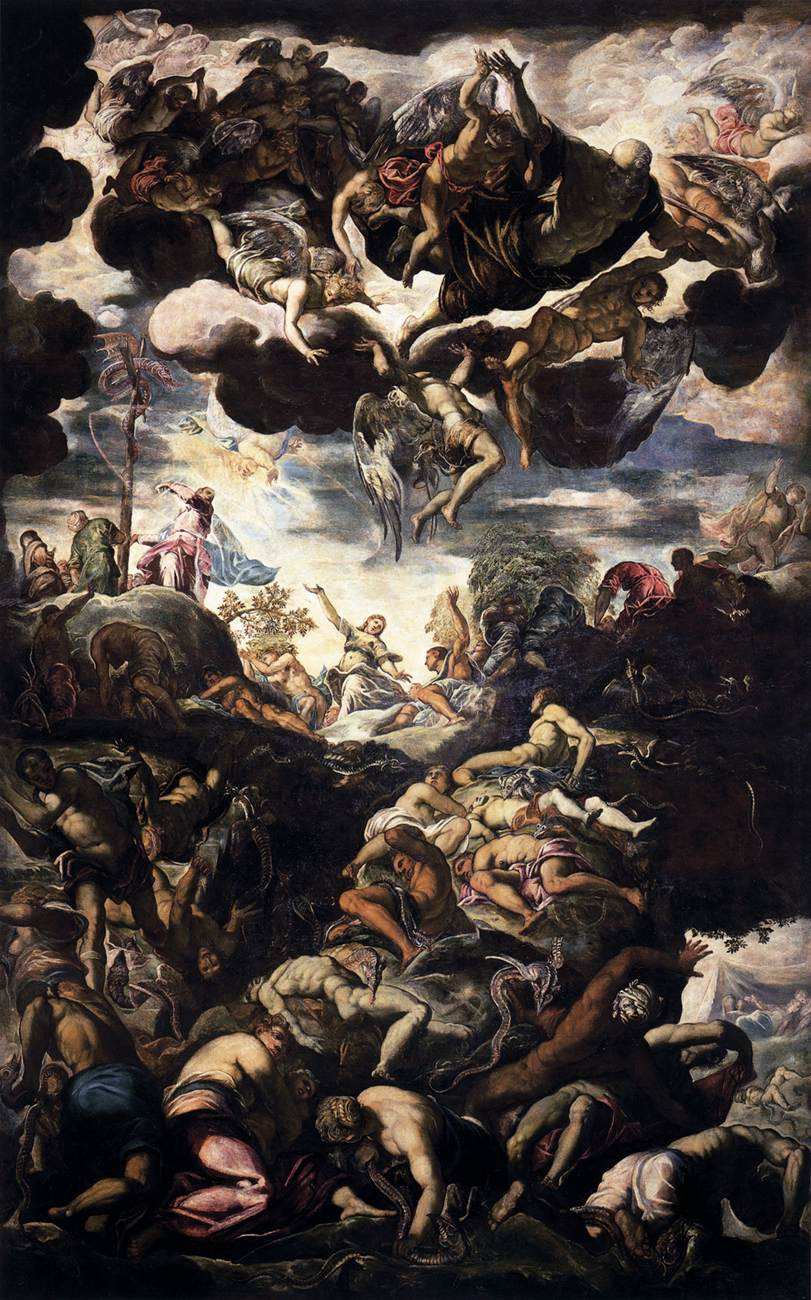
Miracle of the Bronze Serpent from the Tintoretto cycle

In 1564 the painter Tintoretto was commissioned to provide paintings for the Scuola, and his most renowned works are to be found in the Sala dell'Albergo and the Sala Superiore. All the works in the building are by him, or his assistants, including his son Domenico: they were executed between 1564 and 1587. Works in the sala terra are in homage to the Virgin Mary, and concentrate on episodes from her life. In the sala superiore, works on the ceiling are from the Old Testament, and on the walls from the New Testament. Together, they show the biblical story from Fall to Redemption.

A sculpture of Tintoretto with his paintbrushes is featured, as well as a relief carved to look like a bookcase.

Main works include:

- Sala Terrena (complete list)
  - Annunciation
  - Adoration of the Magi
  - The Flight into Egypt
  - The Slaughter of the Innocents
  - Presentation in the Temple
  - The Assumption of Mary
  - St Mary Magdalen
  - St Mary of Egypt
- Sala Superiore (ceiling)
  - Adam and Eve
  - Jacob's Ladder
  - God Appears to Moses
  - The Passover
  - The Pillar of Fire
  - The Fall of Manna in the Desert
  - Moses Strikes Water from the Rock
  - Miracle of the Bronze Serpent
  - Elijah is Fed by the Angels
  - Elisha Distributes Bread
  - The Vision of the Prophet Ezekiel
- Sala Superiore (walls)
  - The Adoration of the Shepherds
  - The Baptism
  - Christ Tempted by Satan
  - Christ Heals the Paralytic
  - Multiplication of Bread and Fishes
  - The Resurrection of Lazarus
  - The Last Supper
  - The Agony in the Garden
  - The Resurrection
  - The Ascension
  - Wooden: episodes of the Old Testament by Giuseppe Angeli
- Sala dell'Albergo
  - Allegory of St. John's Guild
  - Allegory of St. Mark's Guild
  - Allegory of St. Theodore's Guild
  - Allegory of the Charity Guild
  - Allegory of the Misericordia (Mercy) Guild
  - Christ Before Pilate
  - Ecce Homo (The Crowning with Thorns)
  - Ascent to Calvary
  - The Crucifixion
  - The Apotheosis of St. Roch

Other works present include paintings by Titian and Palma il Giovane, and a series of wooden panels with allegorical figures in the Chapter house carved by Francesco Pianta between 1657 and 1658.

== Music ==
In its heyday the scuola was an important patron of music, employing musicians such as Giovanni Gabrieli. Gabrieli took on the post of organist in addition to his work at St Mark's, and he composed music specifically for the location. A contemporary account of how the music impressed an English traveller was published in Coryat's Crudities (1611).

In 1958 Stravinsky's Threni was premiered at the scuola with the composer conducting.

== Access and conservation ==
The Scuola Grande is open daily all the year round, except for Christmas Day and January 1.

The paintings were in need of conservation work, and have been restored by the World Monuments Fund.

== Gallery ==
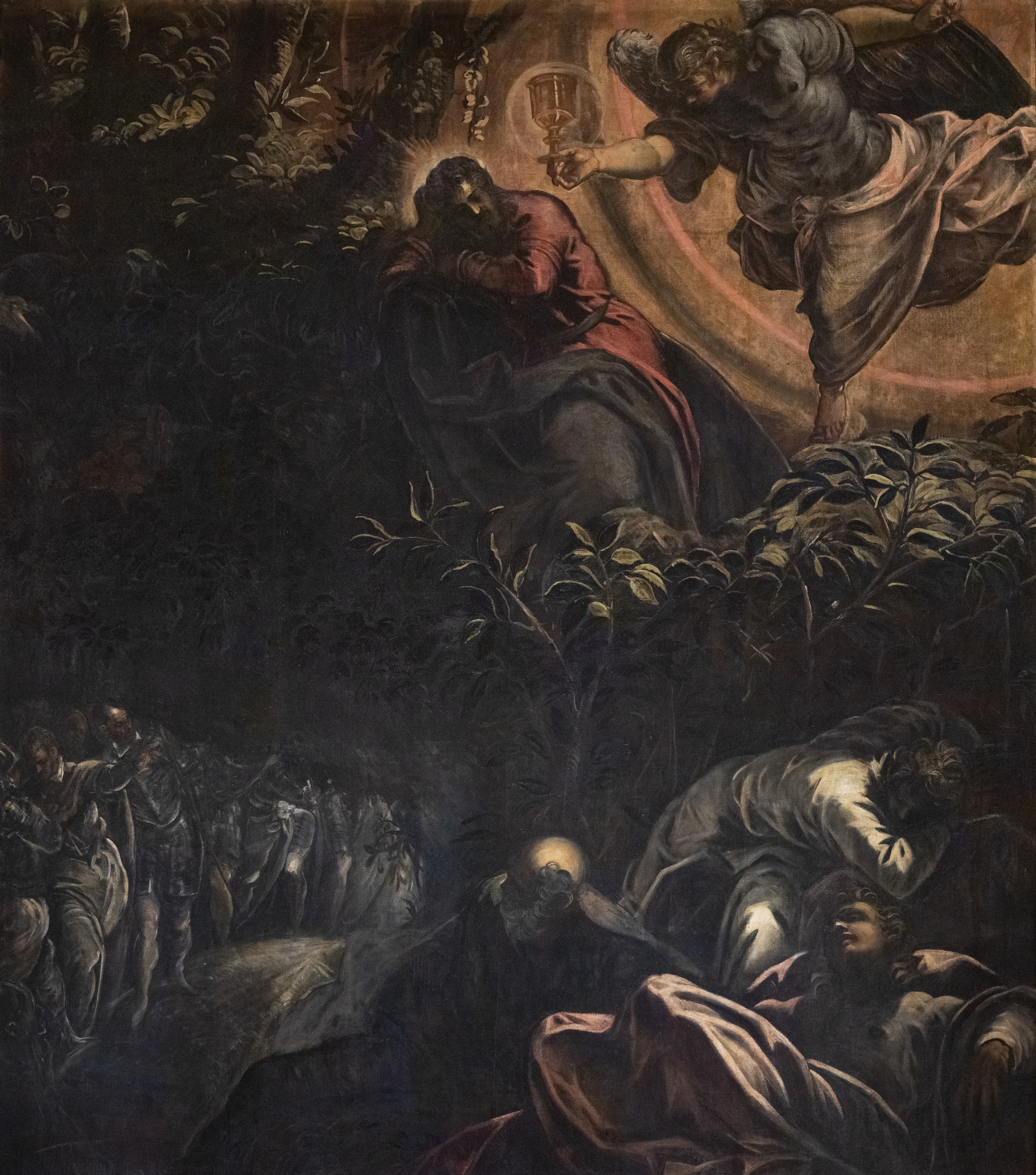
The Prayer in the Garden

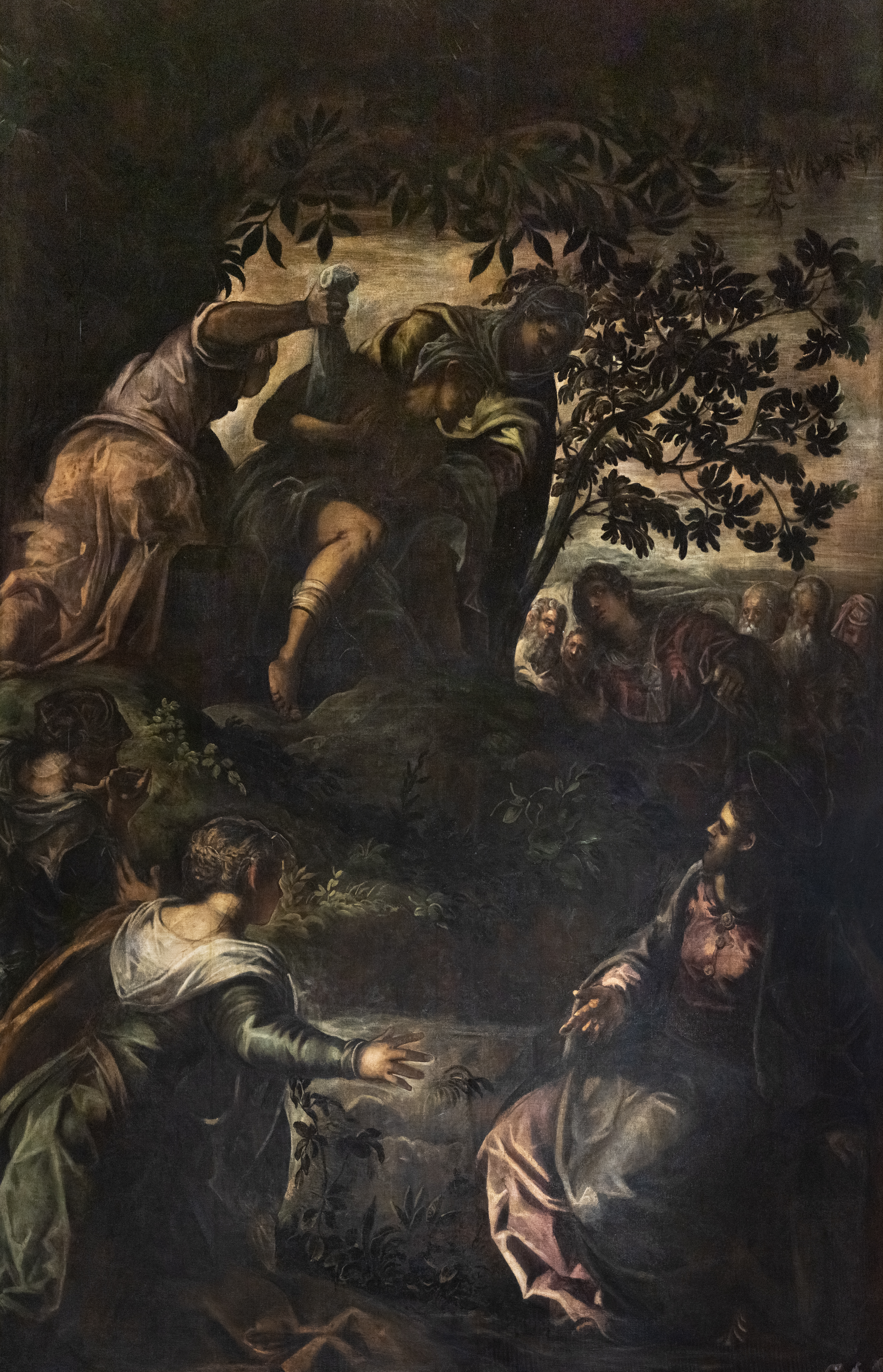
The Raising of Lazarus

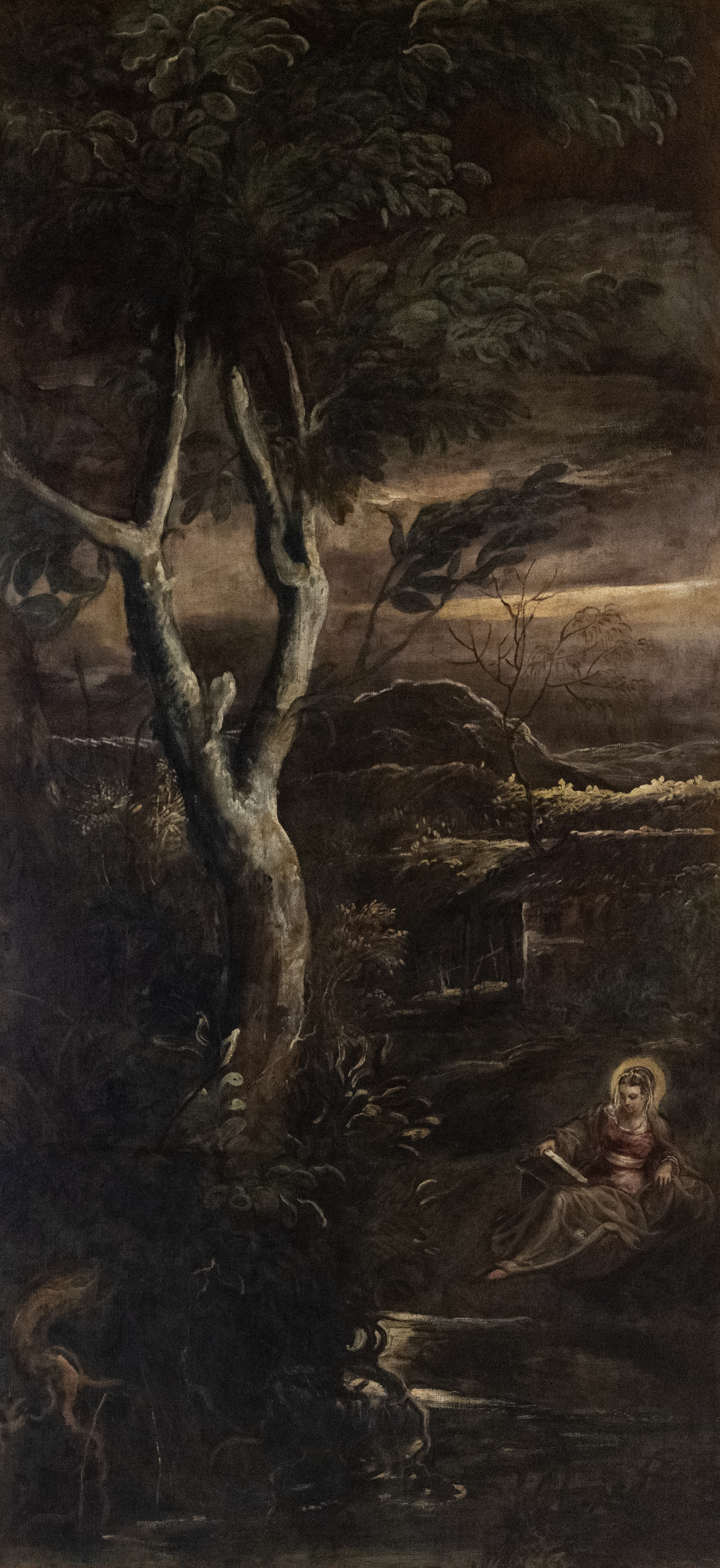
St Mary Magdalen

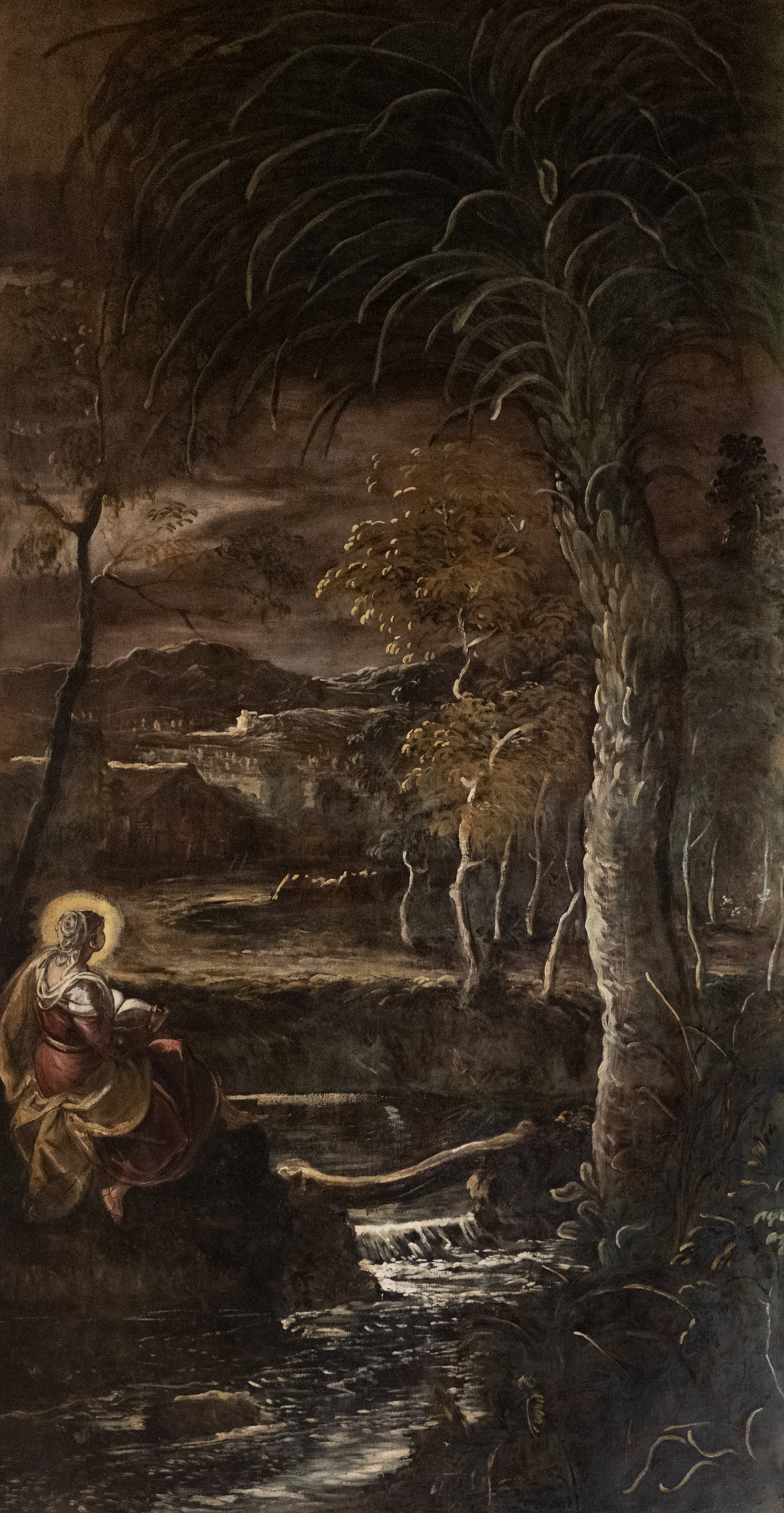
St Mary of Egypt

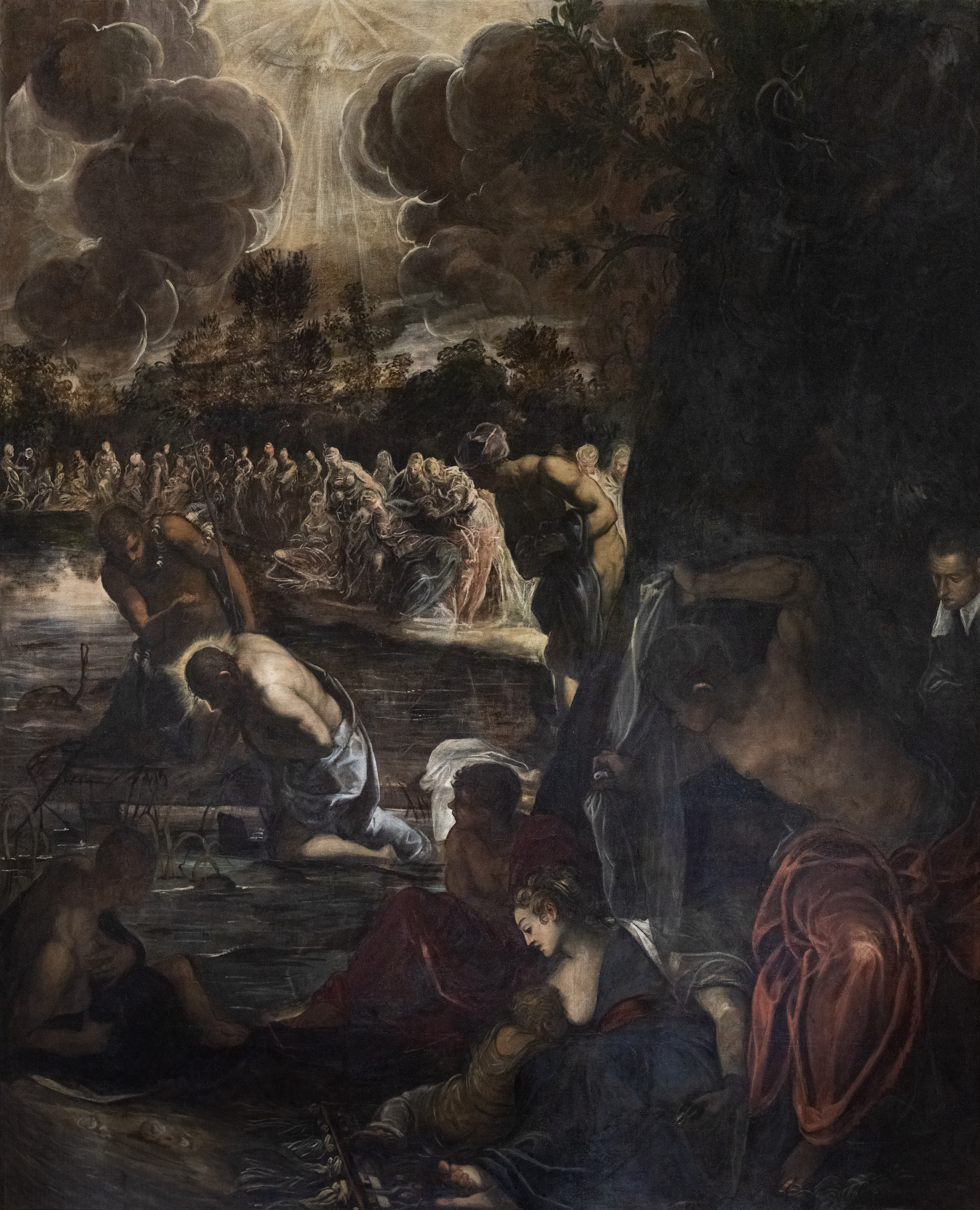
The Baptism of Christ

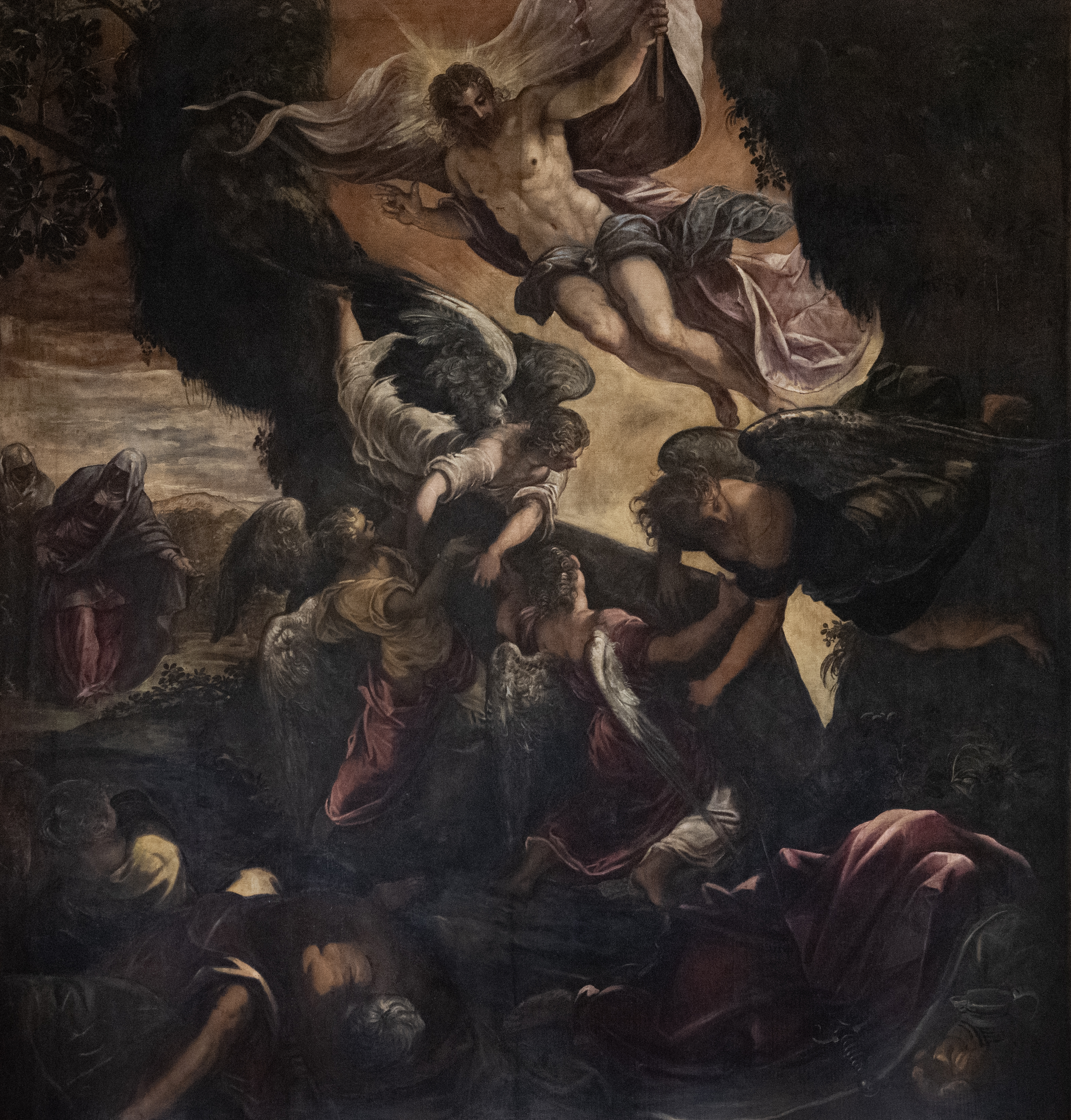
The Resurrection of Christ

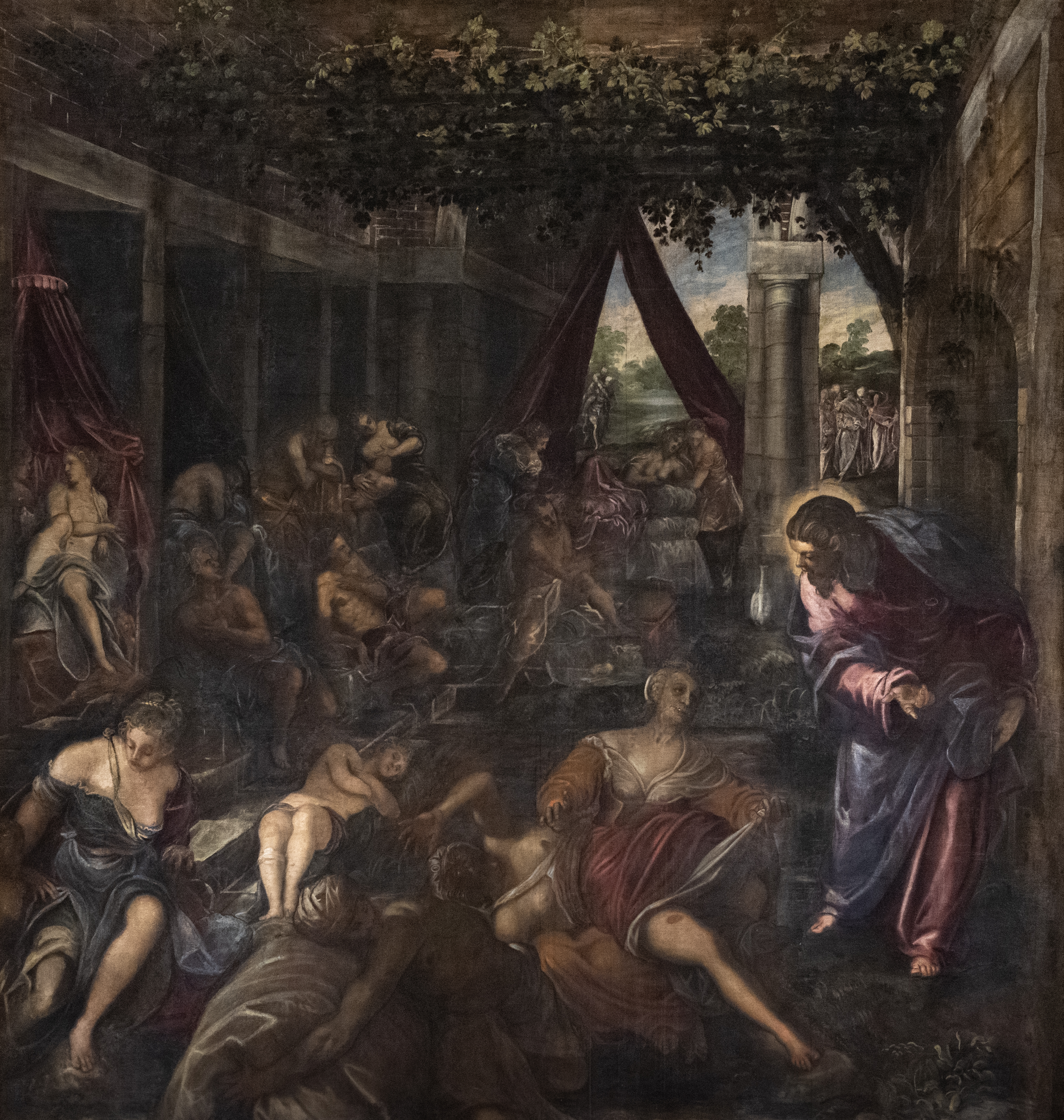
Pool of Bethesda

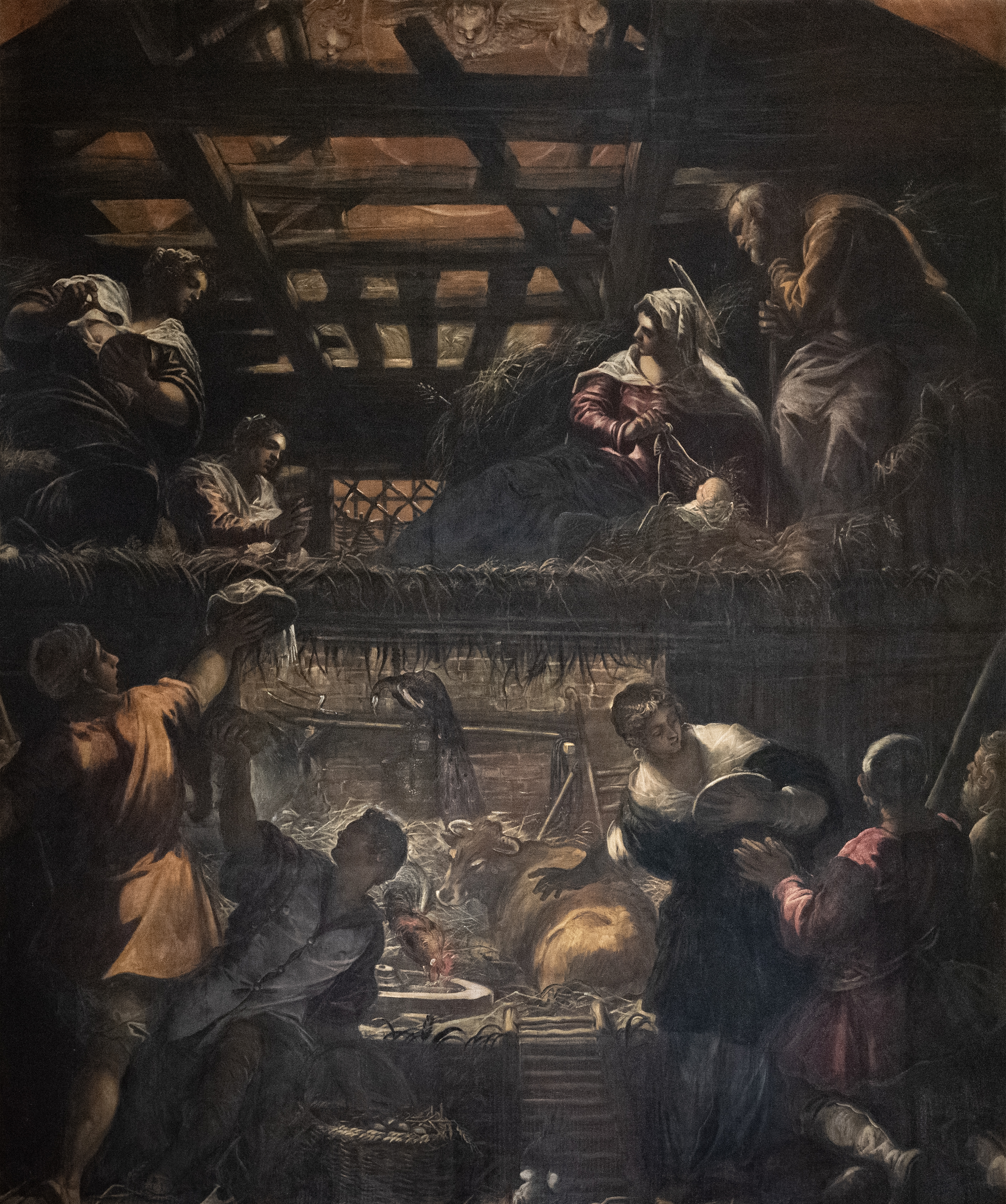
Adoration of the Shepherds

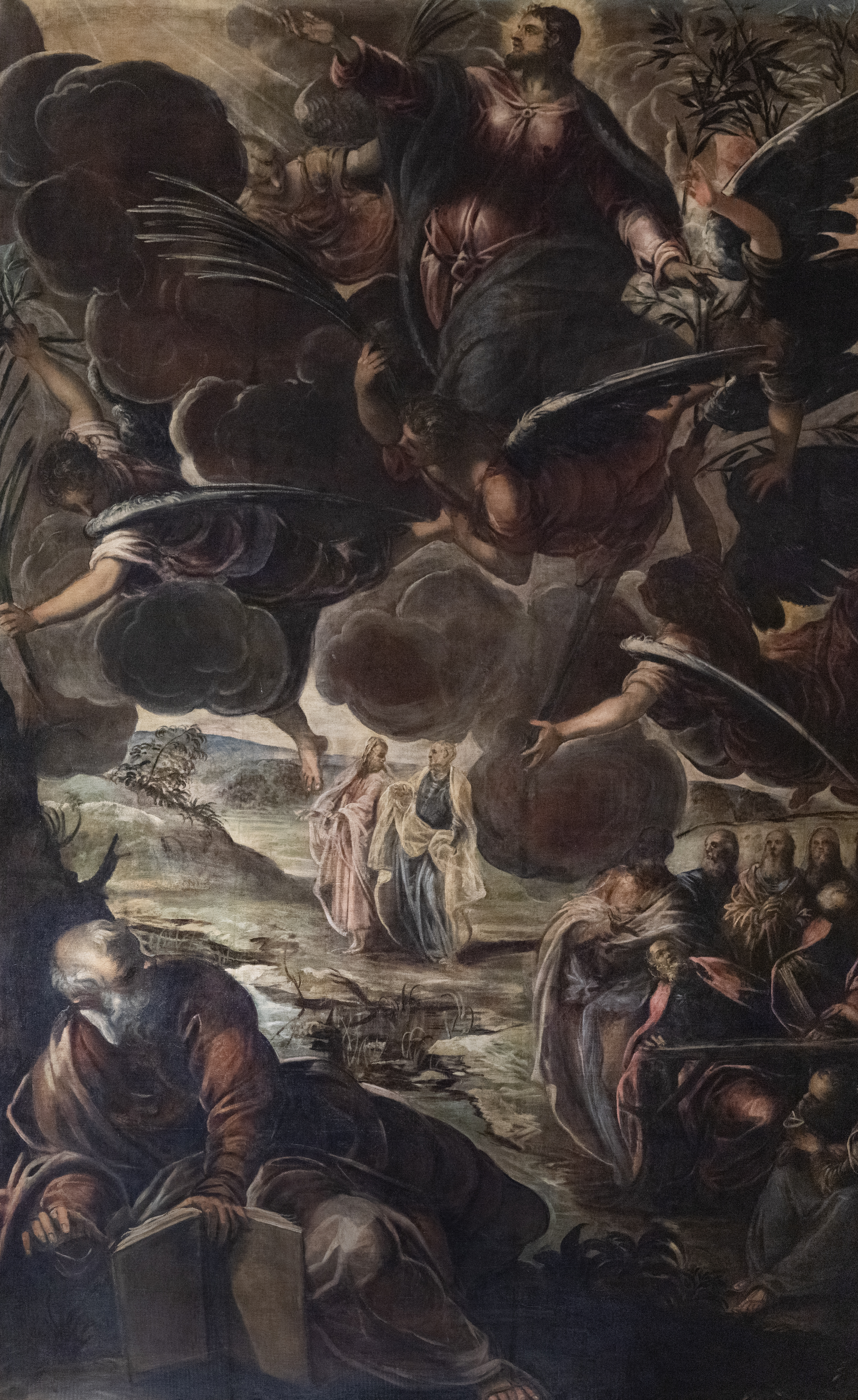
The Ascension
