= Capello =

Capello is a surname of Italian origin that may refer to:

- Alessandro Capello (born 1995), Italian footballer
- Ambrosius Capello (1597–1676), bishop of Antwerp
- Angelo Cappello (born 2002), Belizean professional footballer
- Bartolomeo Ignazio Capello (1689–1768), Italian painter
- Davide Capello (born 1984), Italian footballer
- Domenico Capello (1888–1950), Italian footballer
- Fabio Capello (born 1946), Italian footballer and football manager
- Giovanni Antonio Capello (1699–1741), Italian painter
- Luigi Capello (1859–1941), Italian army officer
- Rinaldo Capello (born 1964), Italian racing driver
- Sherry Capello, mayor of Lebanon, Pennsylvania
- Vittore Capello (1588–1648), Roman Catholic prelate

== Fictional characters ==
- Giovanni Capello, the Italian student in Mind Your Language, played by George Camiller

== See also ==
- Cappello
- Cappello romano, a hat worn by Catholic clergy
- Copello, a similar Spanish-language surname
- Elvira Cupello Calônio
