= San Samuele, Venice =

Church in Venice, Italy

San Samuele
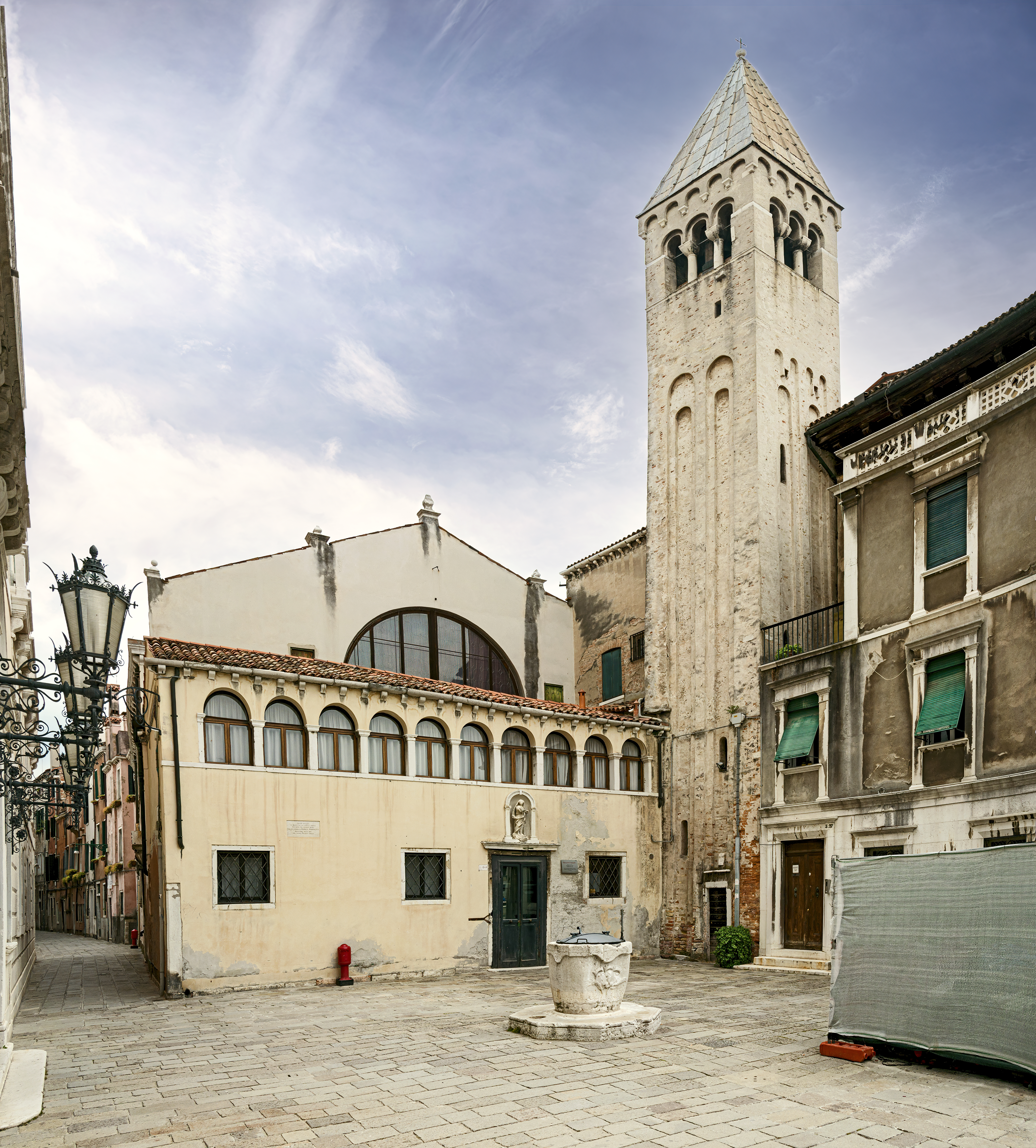
- San Samuele facade church and belltower

- Location within Venice Location within Italy

Religion
- Affiliation: Roman Catholic
- Province: Venice

Location
- Location: Venice, Italy
- Interactive map of San Samuele
- Coordinates: 45°26′01″N 12°19′41″E

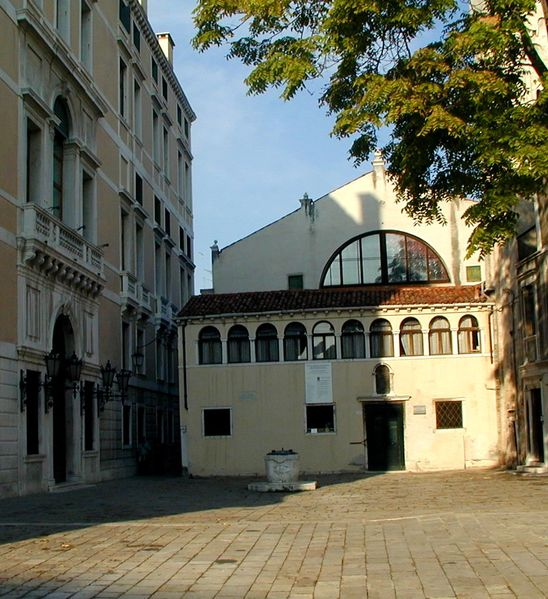
Facade with loggia, to the left stands Palazzo Grassi.

San Samuele is a church in Venice, northern Italy. It is located in the eponymous campo near Palazzo Grassi and Palazzo Malipiero. The facade is set back on the campo, but faces and is visible from the Grand Canal. It is named after the Biblical Samuel, because in the interior are housed relics traditionally attributed to him.

The church was built around 1000 by the families Boldù and Soranzo. In the early 12th centuries it was destroyed by two fires and then reconstructed. In 1685, it was again almost entirely rebuilt. The portico on the façade, now closed, is surmounted by a loggia added in 1952.

The interior, over the high altar, houses a 14th-century crucifix attributed to Paolo Veneziano.

San Samuele bears the distinction of being one of only a handful of Roman Catholic churches dedicated to an Old Testament figure. It is also unique in that its late-Gothic apse has remained intact despite the restructuring of its nave and façade in 1685.

The walls and vaults of this apse have been restored starting in 1999, and are one of the few surviving fresco cycles of the early Venetian Renaissance. The cycle depicts eight Sibyls, Greek and Roman female seers who were believed to have predicted events in the life of Christ such as the Annunciation, the Crucifixion and the Resurrection. The ceiling's quadripartite vault features Saints Jerome, Augustine, Ambrose and Gregory, the four fathers of the Western church, set in roundels and surrounded by inscriptions, decorative foliage, and putti bearing the instruments of the Passion. Above the high altar, the frescoes occupying the spaces between the ribs of the cupola feature Christ and the four Evangelists Matthew, Mark, Luke and John. The cycle has traditionally been attributed to the Paduan or Bolognese school.
