= Copello =

Copello is a Spanish-language surname that may refer to:

- Alexis Copello (born 1985), Cuban triple jumper
- Alfredo Copello (1903–?), Argentine boxer
- Anna Carina Copello (born 1981), Peruvian dancer and musician
- Eduardo Copello (1926–2000), Argentine racing driver
- Santiago Copello (1880–1967), Argentine Cardinal of the Roman Catholic Church
- Yasmani Copello (born 1987), Cuban-Turkish hurdler
- Maria Pia Copello, fictional character in Peruvian television series Maria Pia & Timoteo

== See also ==
- Capello, a similar Italian surname
