= Cappello =

Cappello is an Italian surname. Notable people with the surname include:

- Antonio Cappello (1494–1565), Venetian noble
- Bernardo Cappello (1498–1565), Venetian Renaissance humanist
- Bianca Cappello (1548–1587), Italian noblewoman
- Dominic Cappello, American writer
- Gerolamo Cappello (died 1643), Italian Roman Catholic bishop
- Gino Cappello (1920–1990), Italian footballer
- Girolamo Cappello (1538–?), Venetian ambassador
- Guido Cappello (1933–1996), Italian chess master
- Frank Cappello, American screenwriter
- Mary Cappello, American academic
- Pierluigi Cappello (1967–2017), Italian poet
- Tim Cappello (born 1955), American musician
- Vettore Cappello (1400–1467), Venetian statesman and military commander

== See also ==
- Capello, surname
