= Tribute to the Eucharist (Damaskinos) =

Painting by Michael Damaskenos

- Aλληγορία Θείας Μετάληψης (Greek), Omaggio alla Eucaristia (Italian)
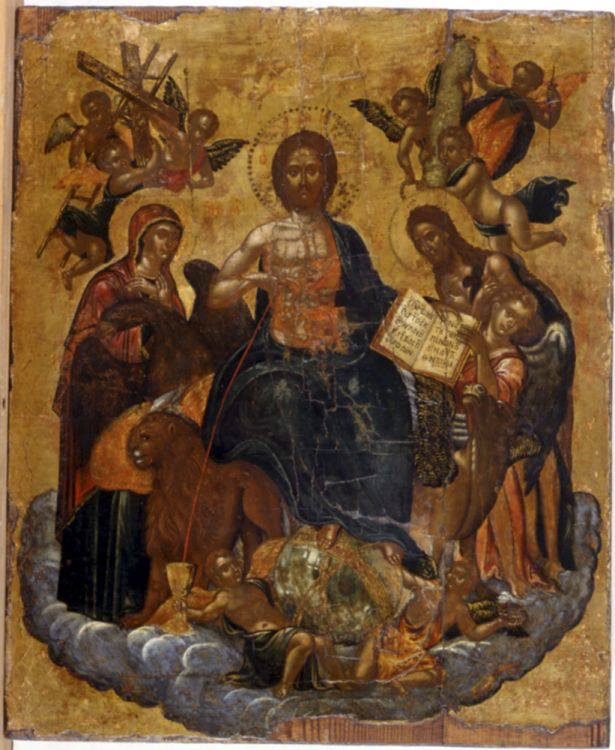
- Artist: Michael Damaskinos
- Year: c. 1550–1593
- Medium: tempera on wood
- Subject: The allegory of the holy communion featuring four symbols of the evangelists.
- Dimensions: 54 cm × 45.5 cm (21.3 in × 18 in)
- Location: Byzantine and Christian Museum, Athens, Greece
- Owner: Byzantine and Christian Museum
- Website: Official Website

Tribute to the Eucharist was a painting made of egg tempera and gold leaf on a wood panel. The portable icon is attributed to Greek painter Michael Damaskinos. Damaskino's existing catalog features over 100 known works. He was a member of the Cretan school of painting. He was from the island of Crete. His contemporaries were Georgios Klontzas and El Greco. Damaskinos traveled all over Italy for over twenty years. He spent a significant amount of time in Venice. He adopted Italian mannerisms. He applied these new attributes to his paintings. He was friends with sculptor Alessandro Vittoria. He had a collection of drawings obtained from other Italian artists. Namely the Mannerist Parmigianino. He was also exposed to the magnificent works of Italian painter Raphael.

One of the most spectacular works of art created by Raphael was the Disputation of the Holy Sacrament. The work is a fresco of church figures debating Transubstantiation. The work is located in Vatican City. Damaskinos saw the work and created his own version of the masterpiece. He created a Tribute to the Eucharist. Two versions of the painting survived the second one is in Platytera Monastery in Corfu, Greece. Many Greek painters copied Damaskino's work. Andreas Karantinos and Konstantinos Kontarinis both created notable versions. Luckily the work was copied by other painters. The work is one of the most important works of the Cretan School because it was heavily reproduced. The portable icon is part of the collection of the Byzantine and Christian Museum.

== Description ==
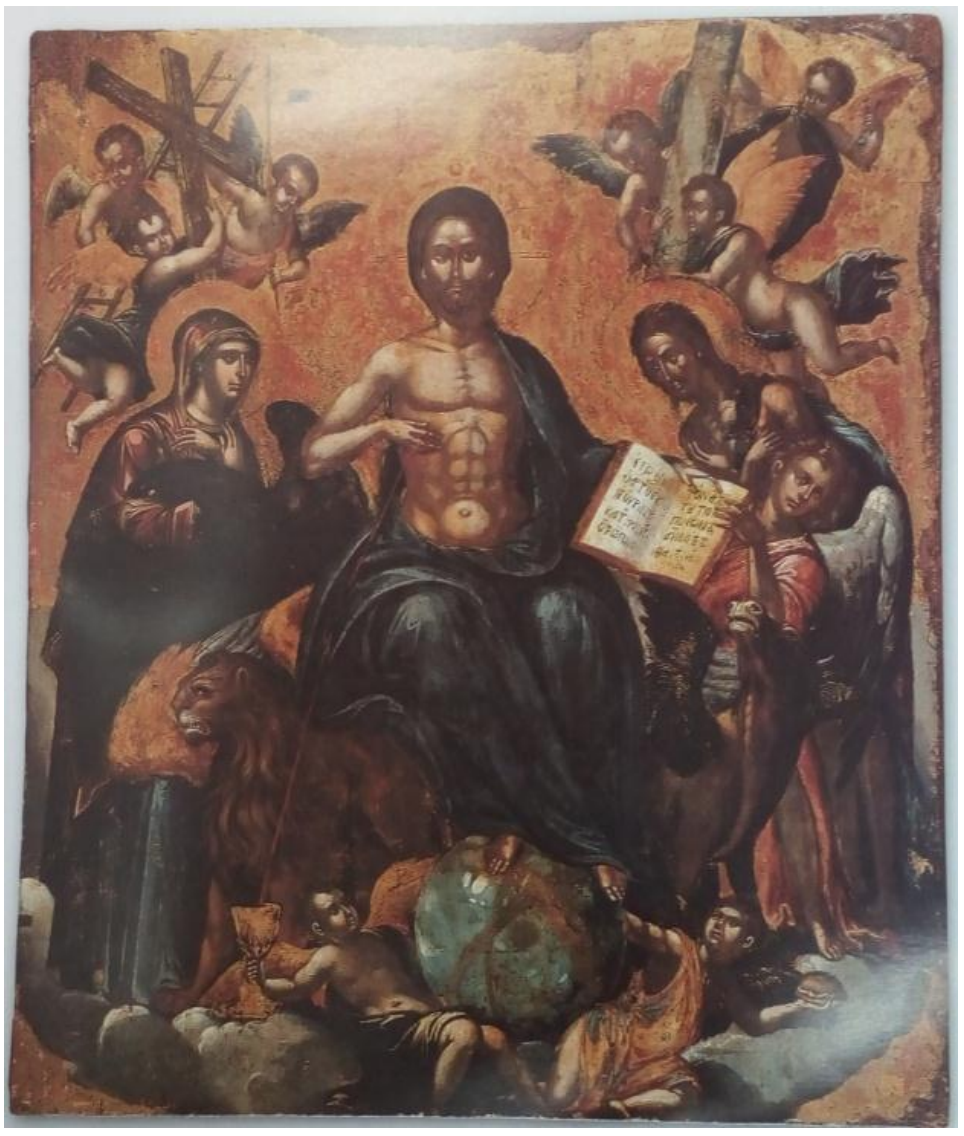
Second Version Platytera Monastery in Corfu

The painting is made of egg tempera and gold leaf on wood. It features a height of 54 cm (21.3 in.) and a width of 45.5 cm (18 in.). The portable icon was not well maintained. It contains some degree of damage. Christ is floating on a cloud similar to the magnificent work by Raphael. To our left, the Virgin Mary is present. The other main figure, John the Baptist appears on our right. They are in the traditional deesis form. Their garments are painted in the style following the mannerisms of the Cretan School. The four evangelists are presented in animal form. In front of the Virgin Mary, an eagle appears symbolizing John the Evangelist. Below the eagle, the Lion of Venice is present. The divine creature symbolizes Saint Mark. On the side featuring John the Baptist, the symbol of Saint Matthew appears in the form of an angel holding an open book. Below the child-like angel, the ox of Saint Luke emerges looking up at Jesus. The four creatures are frequently used by painters of the Cretan School and the Heptanese School. Two angels are at Jesus's legs. The angel to our left holds a holy cup receiving the blood of Christ. To our right, another angel holds a piece of bread. Both are symbols of the holy communion. His legs rest on an all-seeing eye. It features a decorative motif. The supernatural group of figures float on a cloud in the heavens. The figures appear weightless in a spaceless setting. The artist commits to representing the painted figures in a three-dimensional style. The symbols of the passion are carried by six angels in the upper portion of the work of art. To our left, three angels carry the cross, to our right the column of scourging appears. A well-preserved notable copy of the work is at the National Gallery of Athens.

== Notable Copies ==
The work of art is one of the most important painted icons of the Cretan School. Two versions of the work are attributed to Michael Damaskinos. There are eleven existing works with a similar theme and characteristics to Damaksino's masterpieces completed during 1550–1800. The Allegory of the Holy Communion by Andreas Karantinos is very well preserved, it is at the Byzantine & Christian Museum. Two versions are attributed to Stephanos Tzangarolas. One version is in a private collection in Kefalonia and the other is in the Church of Evangelistria in Kastro Kefalonia. Konstantinos Kontarinis also has two versions attributed to him. One version is at the Byzantine Museum of Ioannina. The other version is at the Byzantine & Christian Museum in Athens. Georgios Mazokopos also painted a similar theme. The icon is at the State Hermitage Museum in Saint Petersburg, Russia. Three versions have unknown painters. The Benaki Museum has one of the works with a forged signature of Emmanuel Tzanes. Another unknown work is at the National Gallery of Athens. It was possibly completed by Panagiotis Doxaras. The eleventh version completed sometime within the 18th century belongs to the Abou Adal Icon Collection.

== Gallery ==
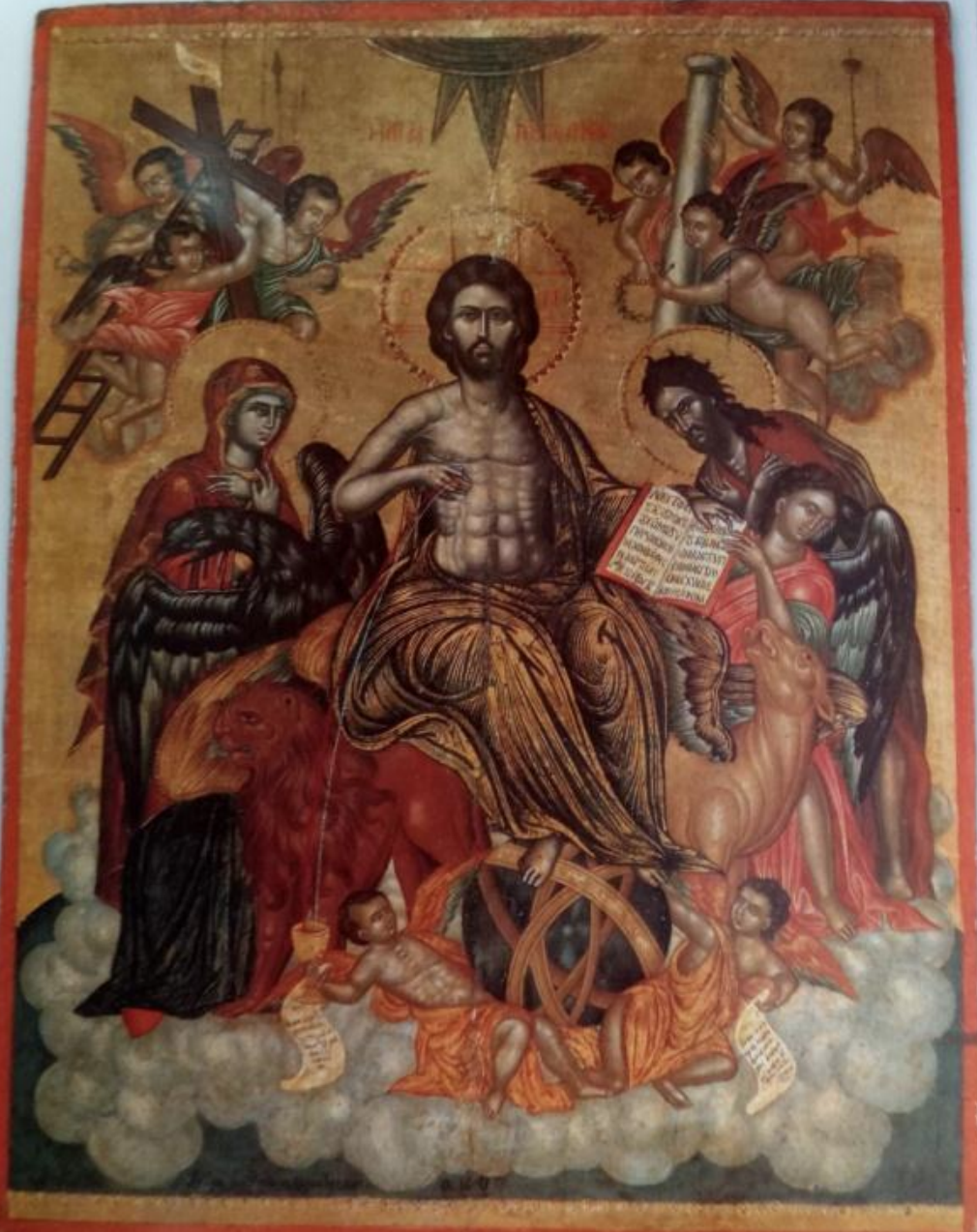
Allegory of the Holy Communion Karantinos

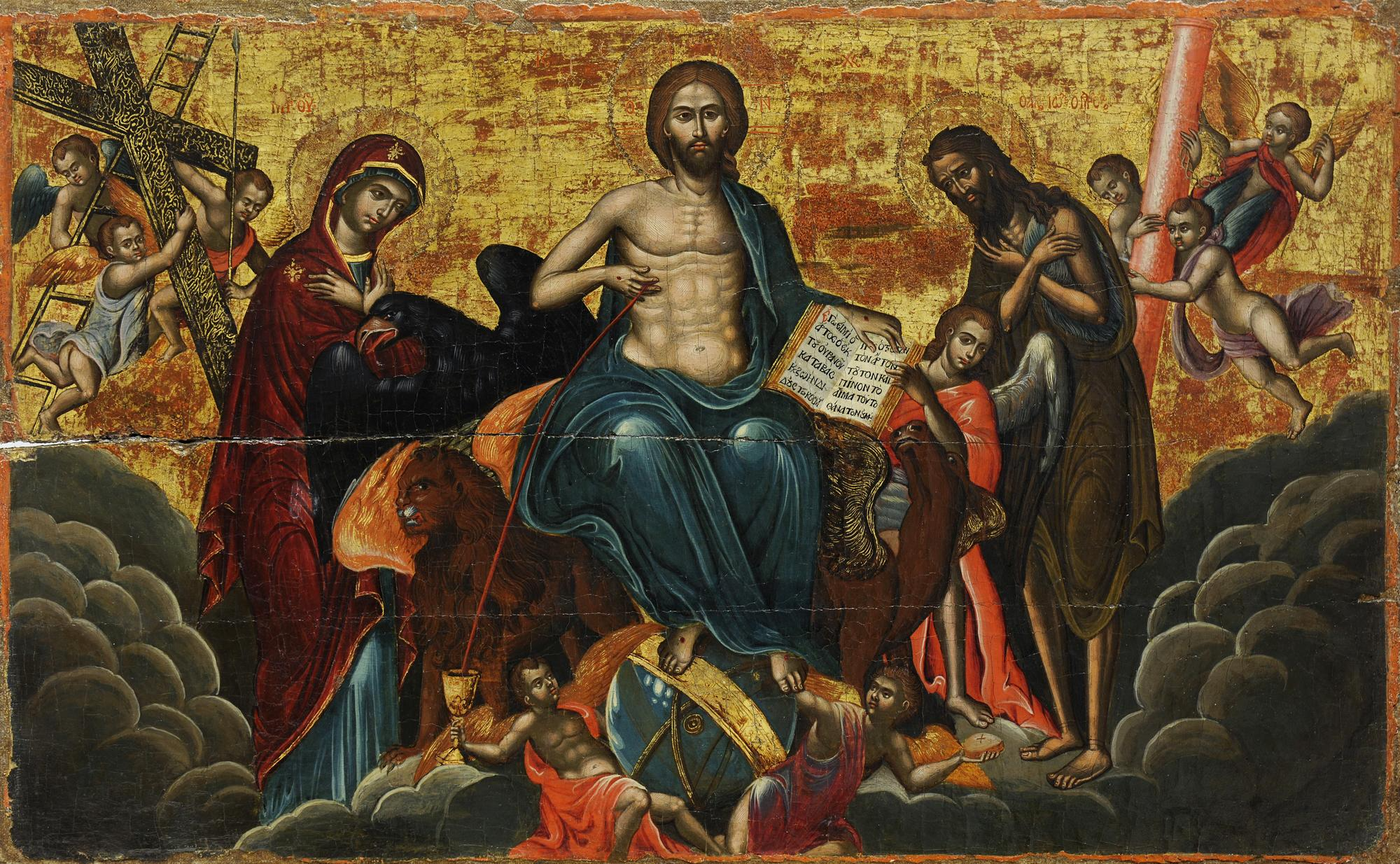
Similar work by Unknown Painter

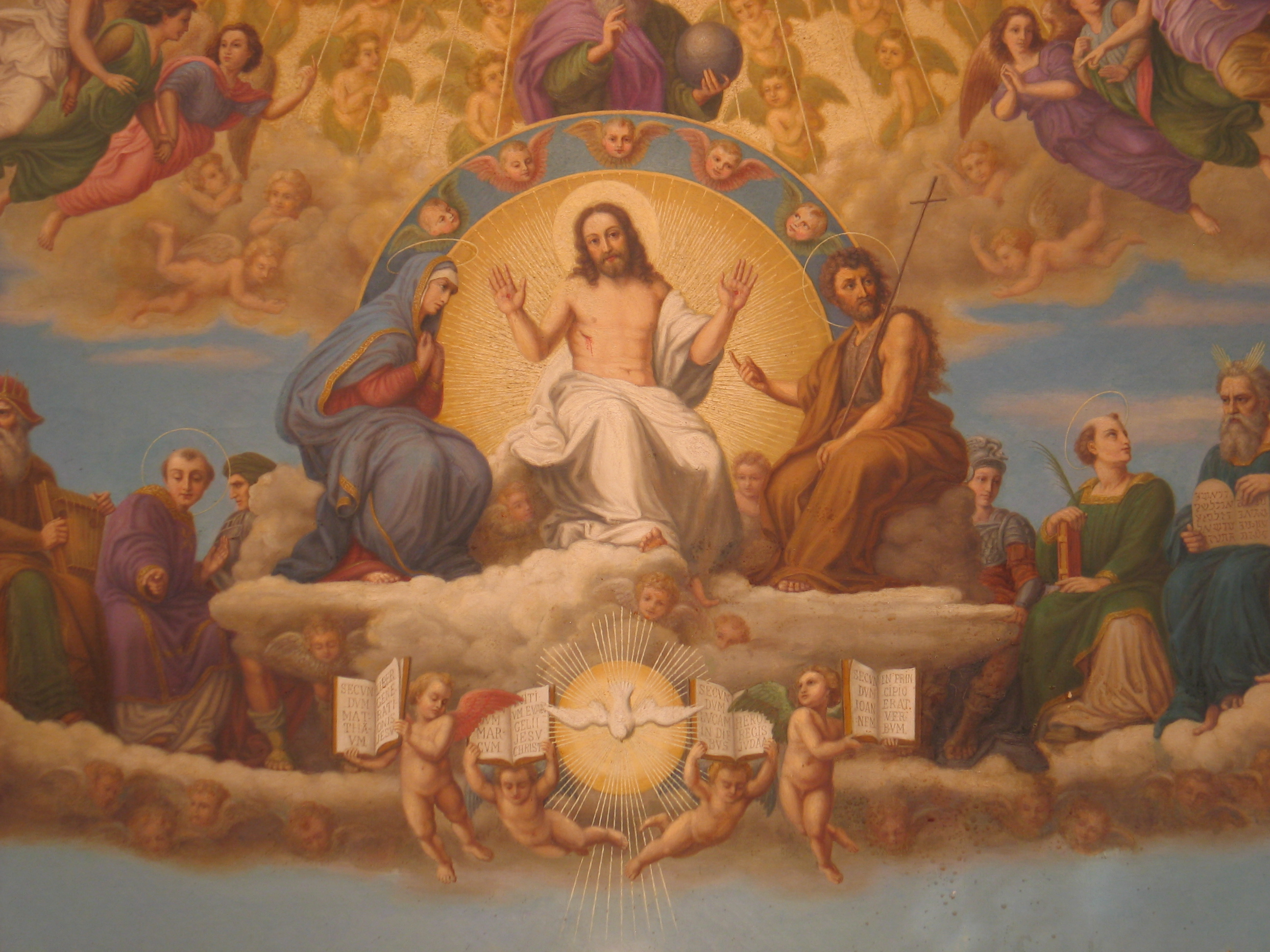
Raphael's Disputation of the Holy Sacrament

== Bibliography ==
- Hatzidakis, Manolis (1987). Έλληνες Ζωγράφοι μετά την Άλωση (1450–1830). Τόμος 1: Αβέρκιος – Ιωσήφ [Greek Painters after the Fall of Constantinople (1450–1830). Volume 1: Averkios – Iosif]. Athens: Center for Modern Greek Studies, National Research Foundation. hdl:10442/14844. ISBN 960-7916-01-8.
- Hatzidakis, Manolis; Drakopoulou, Evgenia (1997). Έλληνες Ζωγράφοι μετά την Άλωση (1450–1830). Τόμος 2: Καβαλλάρος – Ψαθόπουλος [Greek Painters after the Fall of Constantinople (1450–1830). Volume 2: Kavallaros – Psathopoulos]. Athens: Center for Modern Greek Studies, National Research Foundation. hdl:10442/14088. ISBN 960-7916-00-X.
- Speake, Graham (2021). Encyclopedia of Greece and the Hellenic Tradition. London And New York: Rutledge Taylor & Francis Group. ISBN 9781135942069.
- Spratt, Emily L. (2007). The Allegory of the Holy Communion An Investigation of a Post-Byzantine Icon Type that Developed on the Ionian Islands During the Period of the Venetian Hegemony. Los Angeles: University of California.
- Evangelia, Mammi (2019). Η Αισθητική Αποτύπωση τον Μυστηρίου της Θείας Ευχαριστίας στην Βυζαντινή Αγιογραφία [The Aesthetic Depiction of the Mystery of the Eucharist in Byzantine Hagiography] (PDF). Athens: Hellenic Open University Program of Postgraduate Studies: Orthodox Christian Ecology and Religious Pluralism.
- Adams, Laurie Schneider (2018). Italian Renaissance Art. Boulder, CO: Taylor & Francis. ISBN 9780429974748.
