= Virgin Glykofilousa with the Akathist Hymn (Tzangarolas) =

Painting by Stephanos Tzangarolas

- Παναγία Γλυκοφιλούσα με τον Ακάθιστο Ύμνο (Greek), Vergine Glykofilousa con l'inno acatista (Italian)
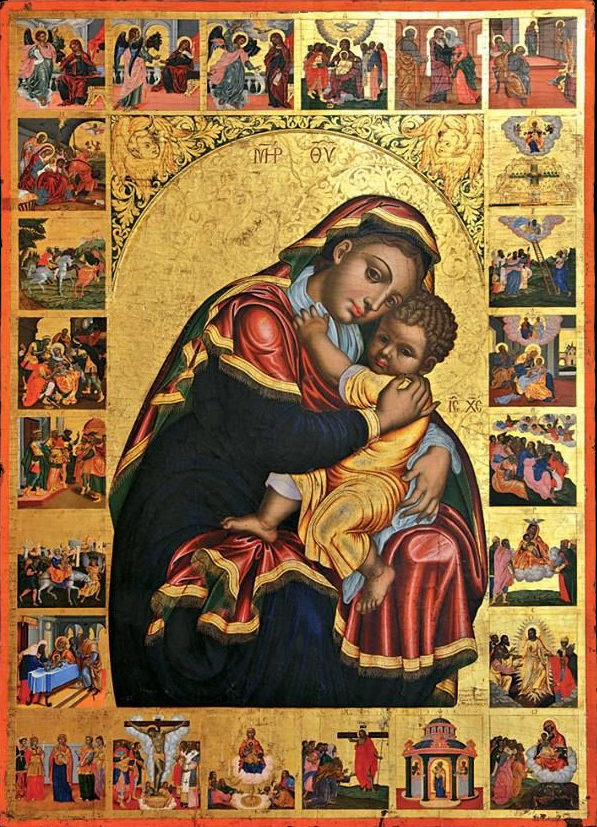
- Artist: Stephanos Tzangarolas
- Year: 1700
- Medium: egg tempera on wood
- Movement: Heptanese School
- Subject: Virgin and Child with the Akathist Hymn depicted as images
- Dimensions: 92 cm × 65 cm (36.2 in × 25.5 in)
- Location: Monastery and Museum of Saint Andrew; Kephalonia, Greece
- Owner: Monastery and Museum of Saint Andrew

The Virgin Glykofilousa with the Akathist Hymn is a tempera painting created by Greek painter Stephano Tzangarola. The work is a symbol of the craftsmanship of the Heptanese school and the evolution of Greek painting from the Byzantine style to the Cretan Renaissance style. Tzangarola was originally from Crete and migrated to Corfu. The Ionian Islands became the artistic center of the Greek world. He was active from 1675 to 1710 during the Greek Baroque period and Rococo. Twenty-two of his works survived. His student was famous Greek painter and Archpriest Andreas Karantinos.

The Akathist Hymn was a major theme in Italian-Greek Byzantine paintings. The Akathist Hymn is a very popular chant sang in both Greek and Latin. The hymn begins with: to you, invincible champion addressed to the Panagia Theotokos (Virgin Mary). It contains 24 components with musical stories mostly venerating the Virgin Mary. Some parts include Christ. Artists created the pictorial representation of the Akathist Hymn. One of the most notable artists to use the Akathist Hymn was Georgios Klontzas. He added the theme to his In Thee Rejoiceth. The masterpiece became popular and copied by many artists of the Cretan Renaissance. The entire piece venerates the Virgin Mary.

The central portion of The Virgin Glykofilousa with the Akathist Hymn closely resembles an earlier painting created by Titian. Many Greek painters were influenced by Venetian painting namely in Crete and the Ionian islands. Tzangarola's student Andreas Karantinos created three works similar to his teacher's painting. Two of them are in very good condition. The Virgin Glykofilousa (Karantinos) and the Panagia Sami. The Virgin Glykofilousa with the Akathist Hymn is part of the collection of the Monastery and Museum of Saint Andrew in Kephalonia. The painting is frequently exhibited all over the world.

== Description ==
The Virgin Glykofilousa with the Akathist Hymn is an egg tempera painting with gold leaf on a wood panel. The height is 92 cm (36.2 in) and the width: 65 cm (25.5 in). The work was completed in 1700. The work exhibits a mixture of the Greek Baroque, Late Cretan School, and the Rococo. Both Emmanuel Tzanes and Ioannis Moskos implemented stylistically similar elements the Rococo decorative gold background was common two both artists. Tzangarola decorated his work with complex rococo patterns namely above the Virgin's head. On the same ornate Rococo decoration, two seraphim appear to our left and right. Below the decoration are the classic symbols ΜΡ ΘΥ. Τhe letters ΜΡ ΘΥ are short for ΜΗΤΗΡ ΘΕΟΥ, it means Mother of God. The Greek symbols are on countless Greek and Italian paintings.

The Virgin and Child appear in the traditional glykophilousa (Virgin of the sweet kiss) or the eleusa Virgin (Virgin of compassion) position. The Virgin has a humble expression of innocence as she looks at her viewers. She embraces the infant Christ. Both figures are painted in the Italian manner. The painter adds realism while combining the maniera greca and the Italian style.

The Virgin and Child are weightless figures floating in space. The young majestic boy relays innocence, charm, and charisma. His reddish curly hair is the same color as the Theotokos. His small hand embraces his mother as she tightly holds her child. His right foot is arched as it rests on her garment. The Virgin's garment is painted in rich detail and color and is gracefully arranged in loose folds. The gold trim of her sumptuous gown is representative of the celestial realm from which she has descended.

Twenty-four scenes surround the heavenly figures. Each scene depicts a pictorial story of the Akathist Hymn. Most of the small scenes depict an illustration from the life of the Virgin Mary. The nativity, crucifixion, and resurrection are included. The artist adds spacial depth and three-dimensionality to each frame.

== Gallery ==
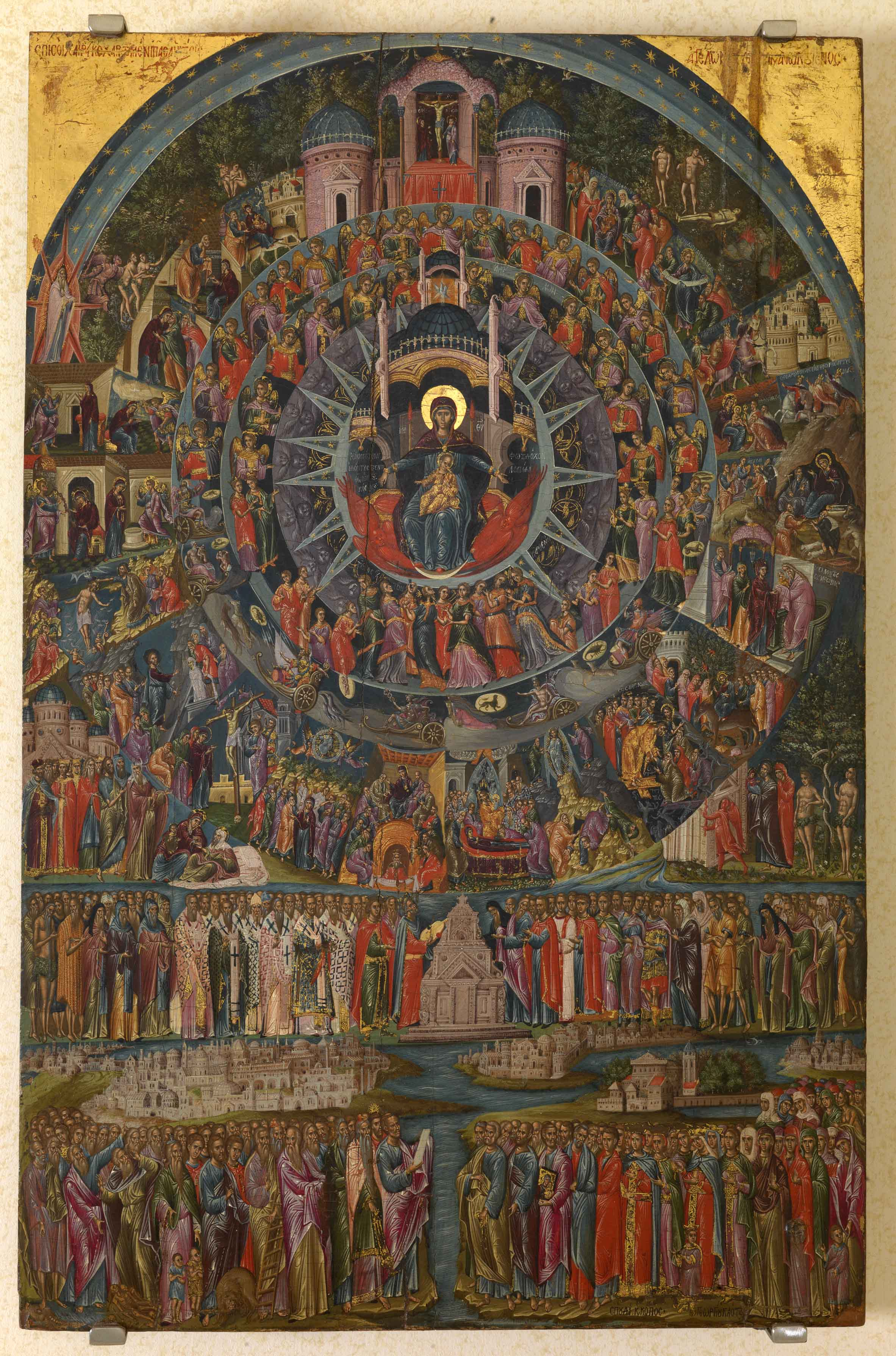
In Thee Rejoiceth Klontzas

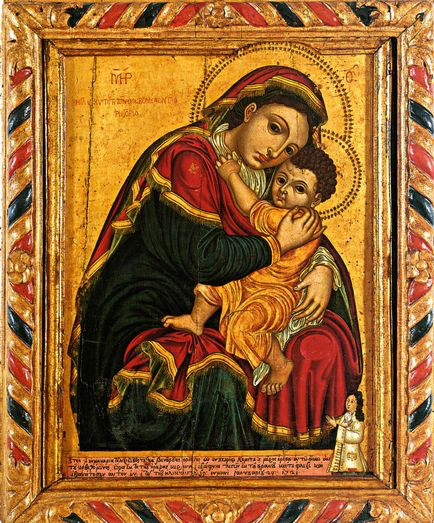
Virgin Glykofilousa Karadinos

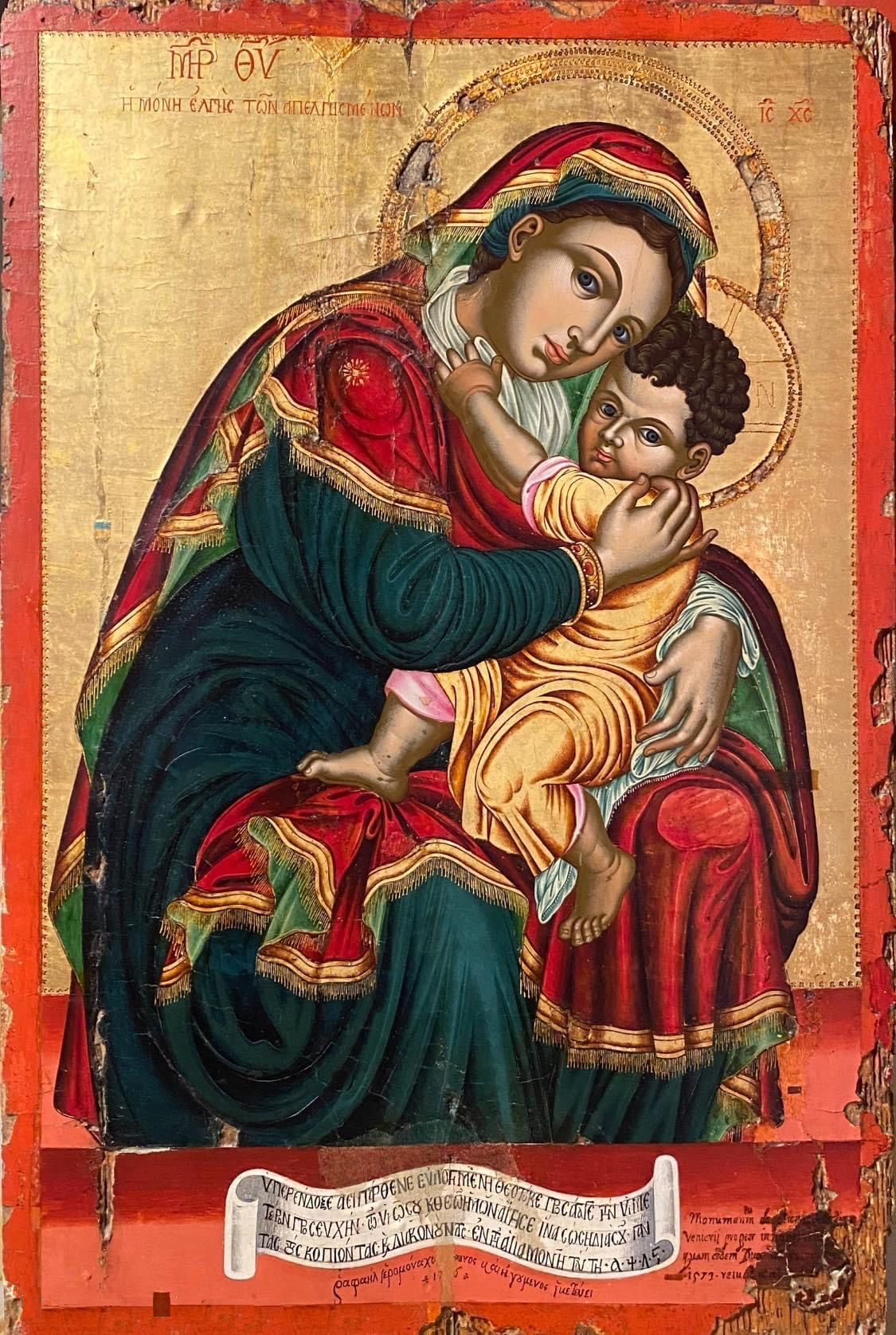
Panagia Samis Karadinos

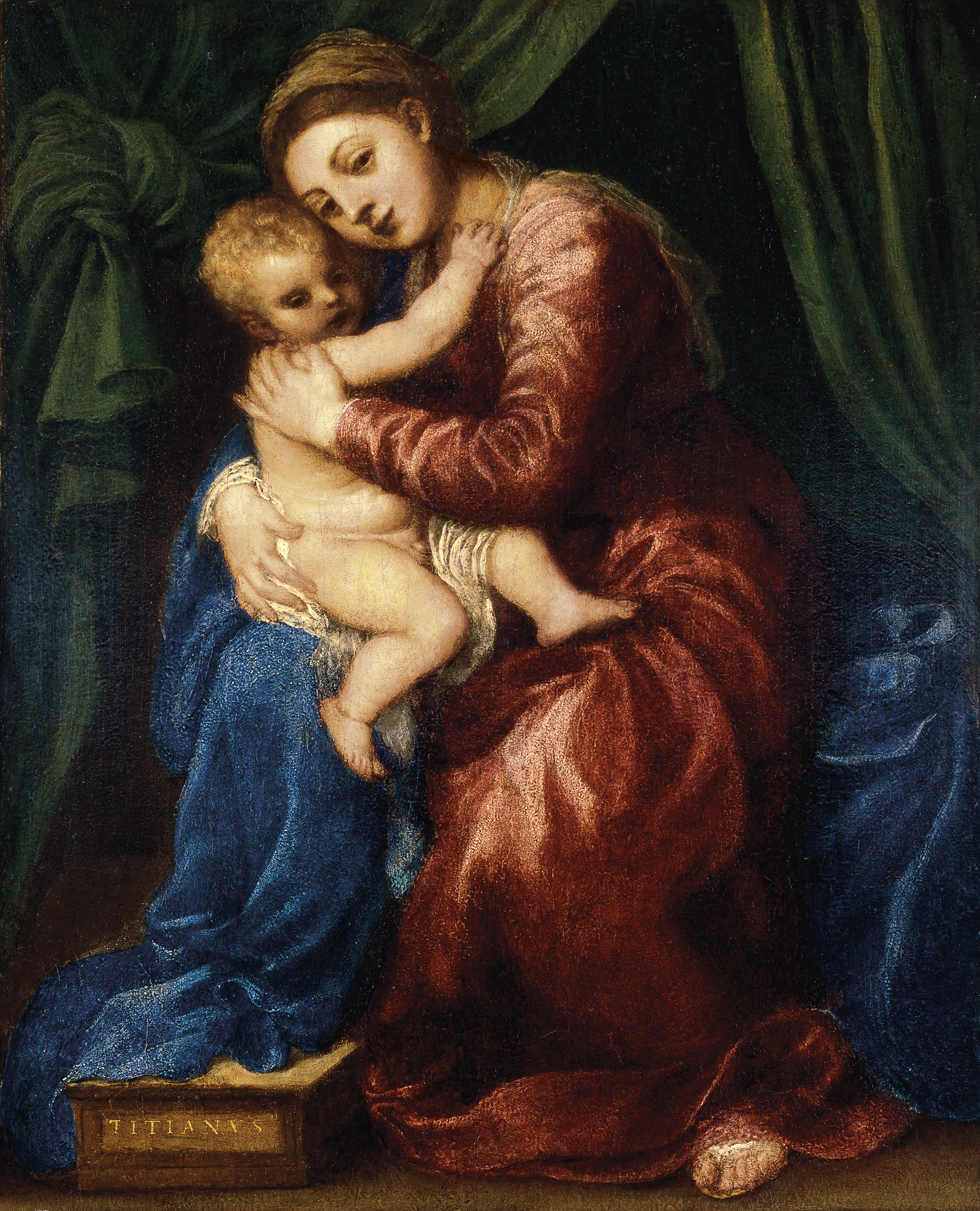
Madonna Col Bambino Titian

== Rococo ==
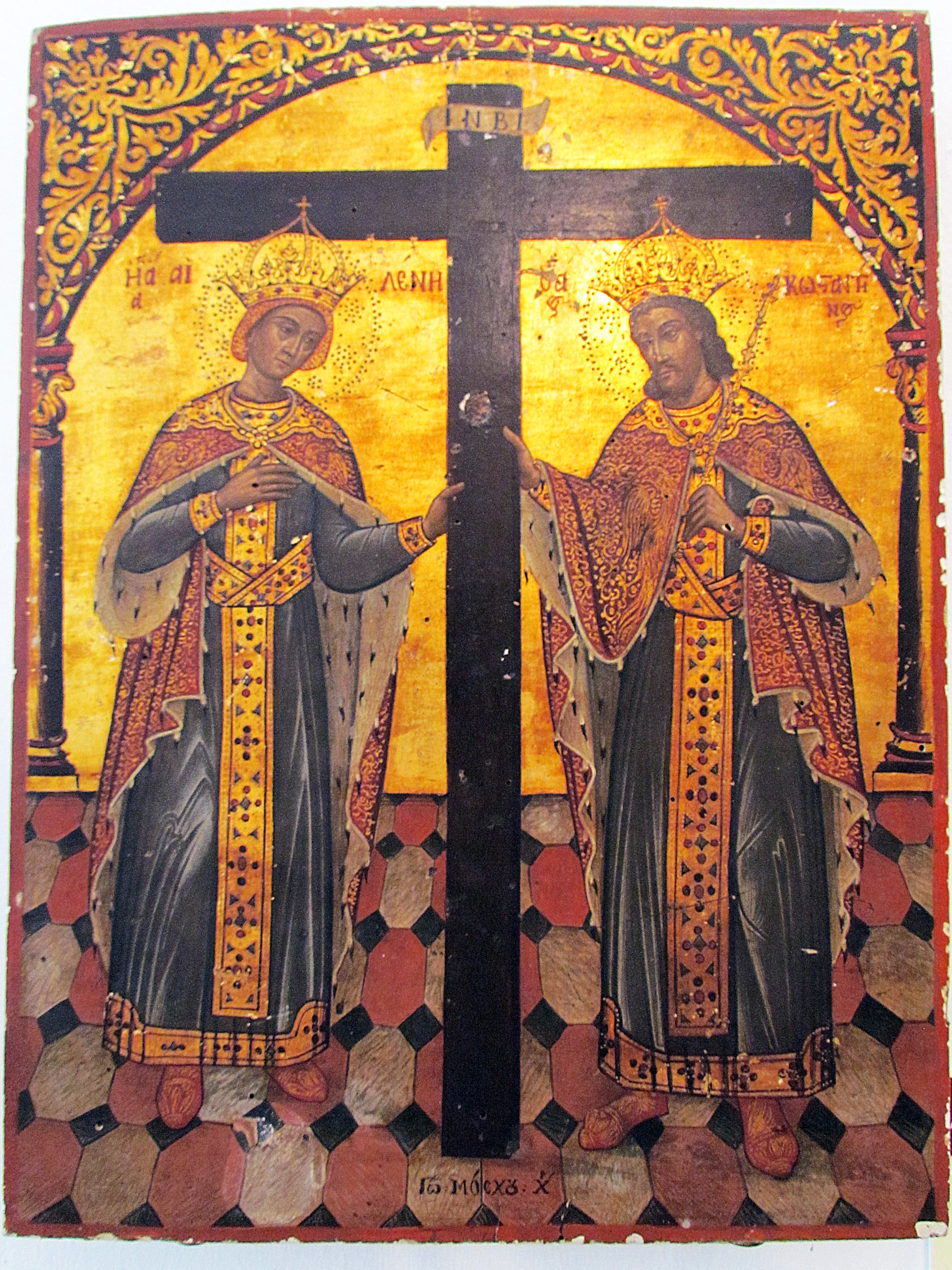
Constantine and Helena Moskos

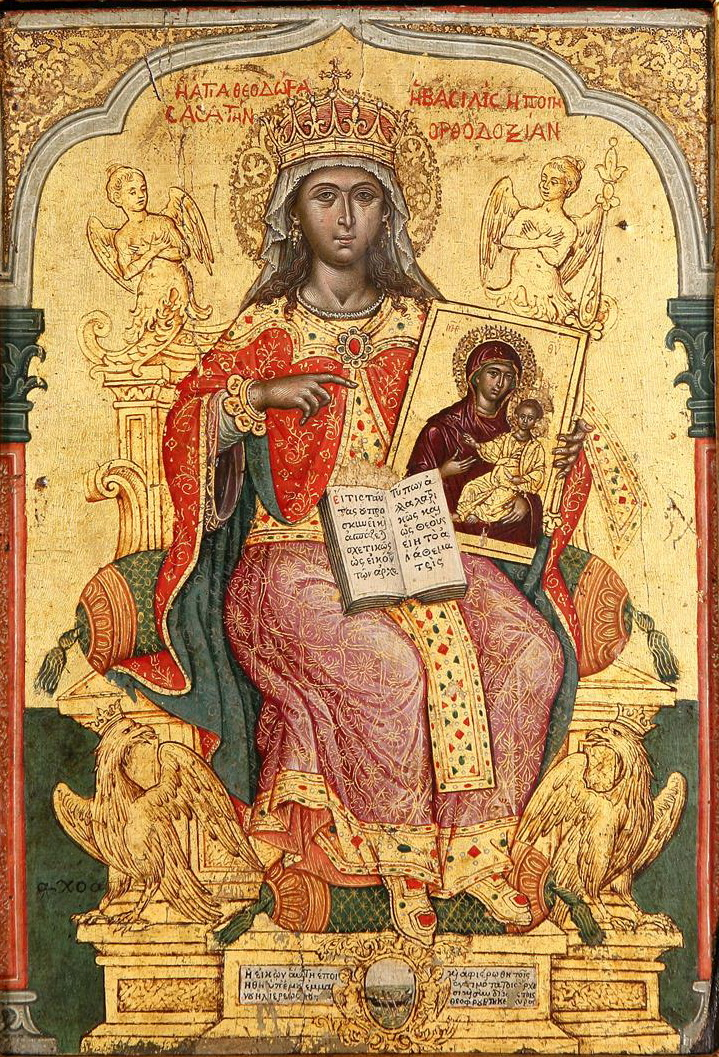
Saint Theodora Tzanes
