= The Nativity of Christ (Poulakis) =

Painting by Theodore Poulakis

- Η Γέννηση του Χριστού (Greek), La Nascita di Cristo (Italian)
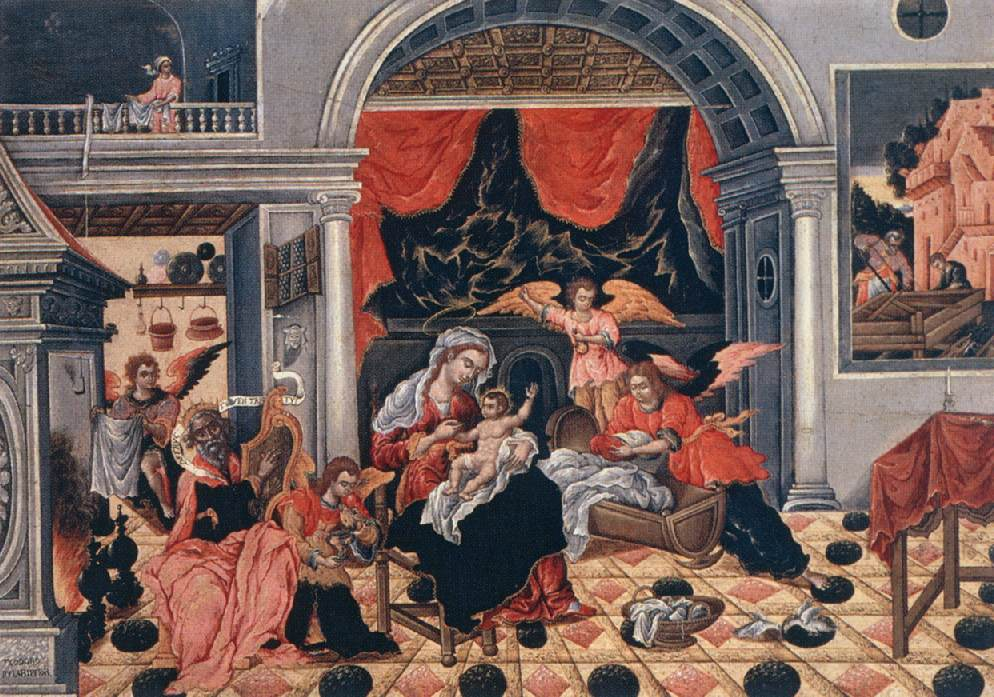
- Artist: Theodore Poulakis
- Year: 1650 – 1674
- Medium: tempera on wood
- Movement: Heptanese School
- Subject: Nativity of Christ
- Dimensions: 47 cm × 65 cm (18.5 in × 25.5 in)
- Location: Museo Correr, Venice, Italy
- Owner: Museo Correr
- Accession: Cl. I n. 1113
- Website: Official website

The Nativity of Christ was created by Greek painter Theodore Poulakis. Poulakis has over 130 works attributed to him and most of his works can be found in Greece and Italy. The painter was originally from Chania, Crete and migrated to the Ionian Islands and Venice at the prime of his career. He was considered a leader of both the Cretan school and the Heptanese school of painting. Poulakis advanced his knowledge of painting in Venice and eventually became a teacher while also involving himself in local politics. During this period, Flemish engravings began to influence the works of Venetian Greek painters, and Poulakis became a leader in the new style.

The Nativity has been depicted by both Greek and Italian artists from the dawn of the religion and is one of the most important themes in Christianity. Some of Poulakis works can be likened to the works of Filippo Lippi and his contemporaries. Poulakis' series of works including: The Nativity of Christ, The Birth of the Virgin Mary, and The Miracle of the Holy Belt, strongly resemble an engraving completed by Flemish painter and print designer Chrispijn van den Broeck. Other works by Poulakis modeled after Flemish art include Noah's Ark which is similar to a painting by Maerten de Vos and engraving by Jan Sadeler. Poulakis painting The Fall of Man is similar to a painting by Etienne Delaune and an engraving by Venetian engraver Stefano Scolari. The Nativity of Christ is in Venice on display at the Museo Correr.

== Description ==
The work of art is made of egg tempera on wood and the height is 47 cm (18.5 in) while the width is 65 cm (25.5 in). The work of art was completed in 1675. Some characteristics of the painting are almost identical to The Birth of the Virgin Mary by Poulakis. Both works feature a woman on the balcony in the upper left corner hanging towels and a central Roman coffered archway followed by a wooden decorative ceiling with square patterns. The works also feature a fireplace in the same position to our left as The Nativity of the Virgin by Chrispijn van den Broeck. Poulakis adopted characteristics from the same work for his Miracle of the Holy Belt.

The mannerisms of the Heptanese School followed a humanistic approach to painting and painters paid closer attention to human anatomy. The Virgin Mary is young holding the infant Jesus on her lap. Jesus' anatomy is small sculpturesque and muscular. The figure is human-centred featuring realistic anatomical characteristics. King David appears crowned playing the harp to the left of the Virgin Mary and Jesus symbolizing his lineage from the House of David. Angels surround the celestial figures tending to infant Jesus and the Virgin Mary. Joseph infuses humility onto the heavenly scene performing his duties as a carpenter outside the window to our right.

== Gallery ==
The Birth of the Virgin Mary by Theodoros Poulakis

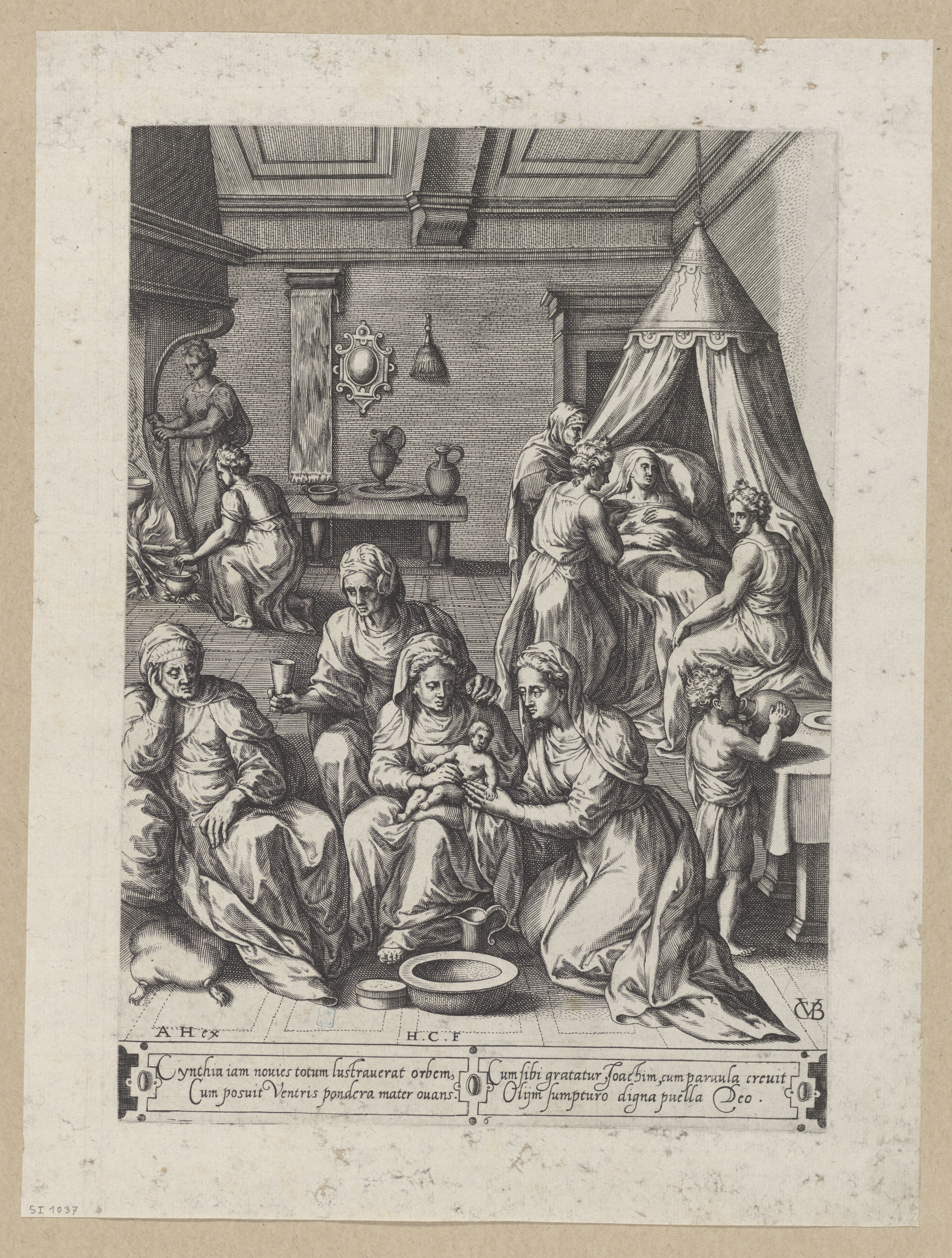
The Nativity of the Virgin by Chrispijn van den Broeck

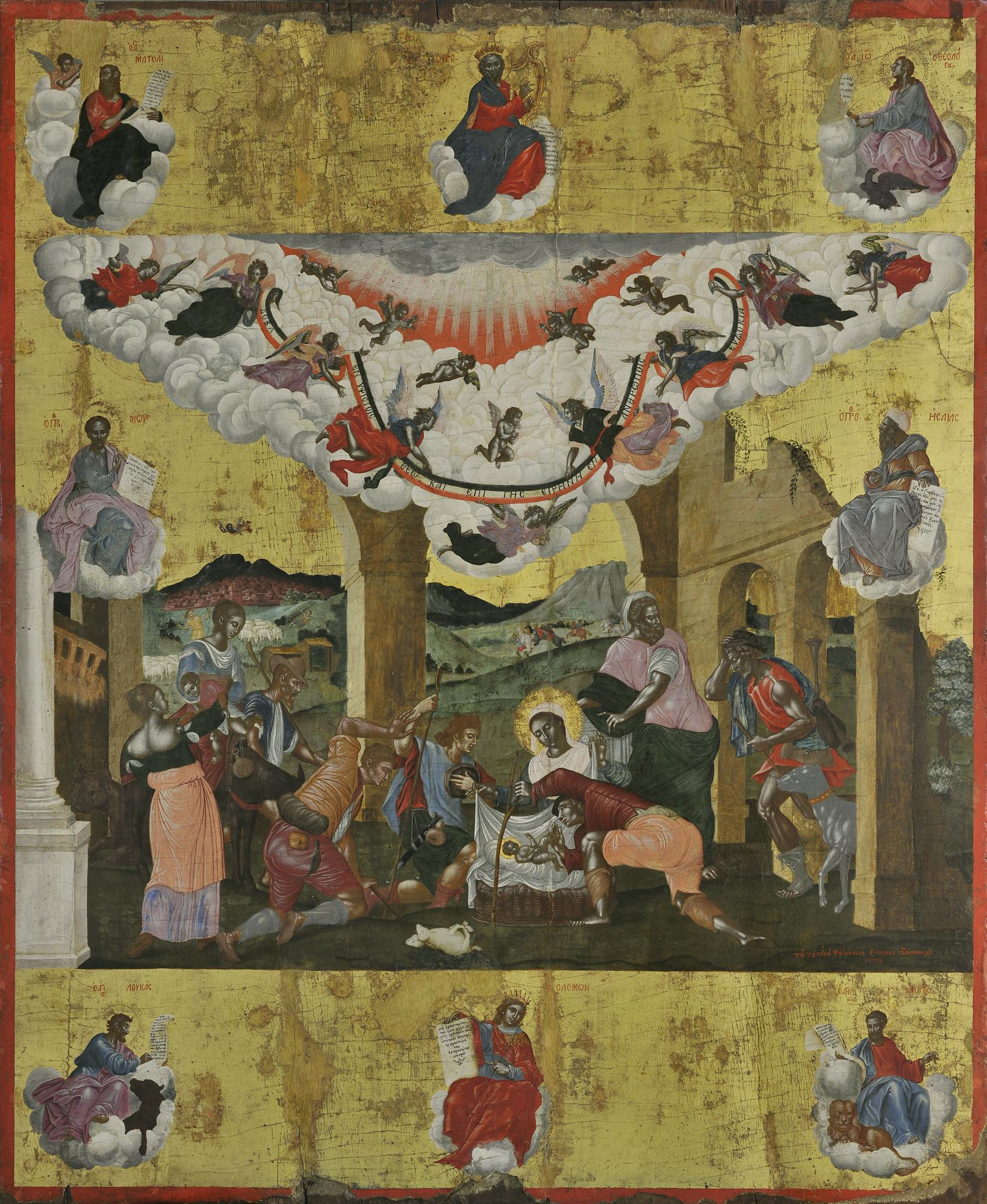
Crowned David Plays His Harp in Adoration of the Shepherds by Stephanos Tzangarolas

== Bibliography ==
- Hatzidakis, Manolis; Drakopoulou, Evgenia (1997). Έλληνες Ζωγράφοι μετά την Άλωση (1450–1830). Τόμος 2: Καβαλλάρος – Ψαθόπουλος [Greek Painters after the Fall of Constantinople (1450–1830). Volume 2: Kavallaros – Psathopoulos] (in Greek). Athens: Center for Modern Greek Studies, National Research Foundation. hdl:10442/14088. ISBN 960-7916-00-X.
- Bouskari, Maria S. (2002). Μουσείο Παύλου και Αλεξάνδρας Κανελλοπούλου [Paul and Alexandra Canellopoulos Museum] (PDF) (in Greek). Athens, Greece: Ministry of Culture Archaeological Resources Fund and Expropriations.
