= Virgin Glykofilousa (Karantinos) =

Painting by Andreas Karantinos

- Παναγία Γλυκοφιλούσα (Greek), Vergine Glikofilousa (Italian)
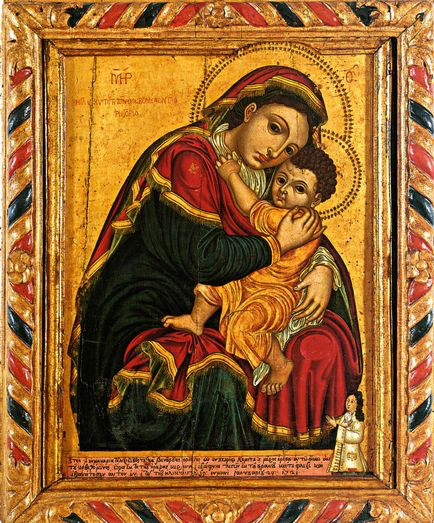
- Artist: Andreas Karantinos
- Year: 1723
- Medium: egg tempera on wood
- Movement: Heptanese School
- Subject: Virgin and Child with Bernardo Aninos
- Dimensions: 73 cm × 65 cm (28.7 in × 25.5 in)
- Location: The Loverdos Museum; Athens, Greece
- Owner: Byzantine and Christian Museum

Virgin Glykofilousa is an egg tempera painting by Andreas Karadinos. Karadinos was a Greek painter active from 1680 to 1740. He was a prominent member of the Heptanese school and a representative of the island of Kefalonia. His teacher was famous painter Stephanos Tzangarolas. Karadinos was an Archpresbyter. He was active during the Neo-Hellenikos Diafotismos and Greek Rococo period. One fresco and twenty-two of his paintings have survived. He was also a goldsmith. A unique inscription on a holy table at the church of Agios Spyridon in Kefalonia features important details about his life.

Paintings of the Virgin Mary and child Jesus were extremely common in Greek-Italian Byzantine art. A very common position of child Jesus is the glykofilousa (Virgin of the sweet kiss) or eleusa (tenderness or showing mercy) position. Famous Greek painter Angelos Akotantos created many works in the style. Karadinos follows the prototype of his teacher Stephanos Tzangarolas. Tzangarola's painting Virgin Glykofilousa with the Akathist Hymn is very similar to Karadinos's work. Historians believe that the specific style of painting evolved in the late 1500s. Tzangarola and Karadinos may have copied an existing work that was on the island of Kefalonia around their time. The original painting did not survive but historical documents name the work of art. Historians refer to it as the Venier. It was in the Monastery Fanenton.

Three works were completed that are very similar and can be attributed to Karadinos. The first was completed in 1715 and was part of the iconostasis in the church of Agios Andrea. The entire iconostasis was moved to the Korgialenio Historic and Cultural Museum. The second version of Virgin Glykofilousa was completed in 1723. The third version was finished in 1736, it is known as the Panagia Samis. It is part of the collection of the Kimisis Church of Panagia Sami (Κοίμησης της Παναγίας στη Σάμη). The latter two works were owned and commissioned by a noble family with the surname Aninos. The Virgin Glykofilousa was in the family's possession until the 20th century. The Virgin Glykofilousa was purchased in 1992. The painting was owned by Gerasimos Psemenatos. The painting was in Kefalonia. The icon became part of the Loverdos Collection. It is maintained by the Byzantine and Christian Museum. The painting is featured in the newly opened Loverdos Museum.

== Description ==
The work of art is made of egg tempera paint and gold leaf on a wood panel. The height is 73 cm (28.7 in) and the width is 65 cm (25.5 in). It was completed in 1723. The painting was created in the traditional glykophilousa (Virgin of the sweet kiss) and eleusa Virgin (Virgin of compassion) position. The Virgin embraces young Jesus in her arms. The garments are colored in the traditional Greek-Italian Byzantine style. The work was heavily influenced by the Venetian painting style.

The gold of her sumptuous gown is representative of the celestial realm from which she has descended. The luxuriant patterns and folds of fabric reflect the advancement of both Cretan Renaissance and Heptanese painting styles. The shadows of the clothing create a more natural realistic setting. The work strongly resembles Tzangarola's Virgin Glykofilousa with the Akathist Hymn. In Karadinos's painting the Virgin and Child both have accentuated curved facial features. The artist implemented a complex shadowing technique. In both the Tzangarola and Karadinos the young heavenly infant has very curly hair.

A small figure appears at the bottom of the painting to our right. He is Bernardo (Vernardo) Aninou. The man is wearing a traditional Venetian garment reminiscent of the garments worn on the island of Kefalonia in the 1700s. The attire reflects his high position in society. Bernardo is also wearing a noble wig. There is a three-sentence inscription on the left of the small figure. The Greek writing is as follows: Servant of God Bernardo (Venardos) Aninos, while in the village Komitata a part of Eriso while sitting in his house, at the sixth hour of the day, a thunderbolt suddenly fell from the sky and killed him he was age 35 in the month of January 24, 1723 (Δούλος τον Θεοϋ βενάρδος ο άνινος ών έν χωρίω Κομιτάτα μέρος Έρίσου έν τώ οϊκω αύτού καθεζόμενος ώρα έκτη τής ημέρας κεραυνός εξαίφνης πεσών εκ τού ουρανού κατέφλεξε και / έθανάτοσεν αυτόν εν έτει τής ήλικίας αυτού 35 έν μηνί Ιανουαρίου 24, 1723).

== History ==
The painting style of the specific icon was adopted from both Titian and Raphael. Most of the famous Greek painters of the Cretan Renassascne copied either Titian or Tintoretto. The painting has a detailed history. The small inscription on the bottom of the work assisted historians in retracing the origin of the icon. According to the inscription, Bernardo Aninos died suddenly and tragically, from lightning, on January 24, 1723. The event took place inside Bernardο's house, in the village of Komitata, located on the west side of the Erissos peninsula, in the northern part of Kefalonia. The Aninos were one of the largest and most important families of Kefalonia. There are detailed accounts about the noble family in the Libro d'Oro. Doctor Janeto Bernardi Aninos was born in 1690 and died thirty-three years later in 1723. Janeto was the son of Micele Aninos. He had three children. The term doctor was used to refer to lawyers.

Historical documents reveal valuable information about Bernardo. He was a lawyer. According to records, there is an inconsistency related to the year of his birth. According to the inscription, Bernardo died at the age of 35, while according to the Libro d'Oro he was born in 1690, so when he died in 1723 he was 33 years old. The testimony of the image can be considered more reliable because it was recorded immediately after the event. Bernardo's date of birth was actually two years before it was officially recorded by the Libro d'Oro. He was born in 1688. There was another important member of the family named Spyridon Aninos. He was a teacher and a very important bishop. The family-owned a church named Saint Spyridon in the village of Poulata in Sami.

Karadinos had a close relationship with the noble family Aninos. In 1736, an abbot named Raphael Aninos commissioned a work that is nearly identical to the Virgin Glykofilousa. This is the third and final version associated with Karadinos. Around this period Karadinos also taught painting to a prominent member of the noble family named Athanasios Aninos (1713-1748). There was a second painter in the Aninos family named Andreas. He was also a deacon.

== Gallery ==
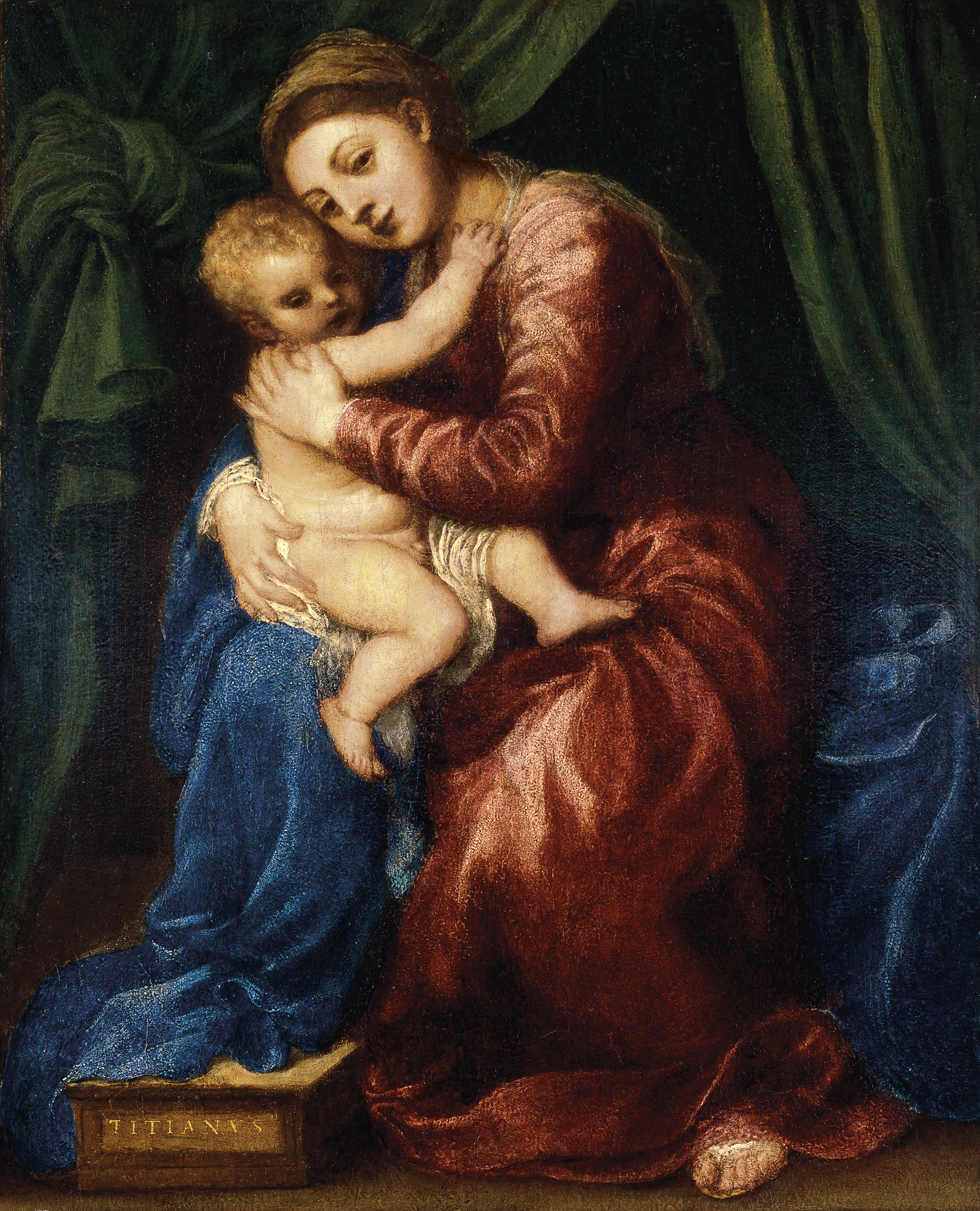
Madonna Col Bambino Titian

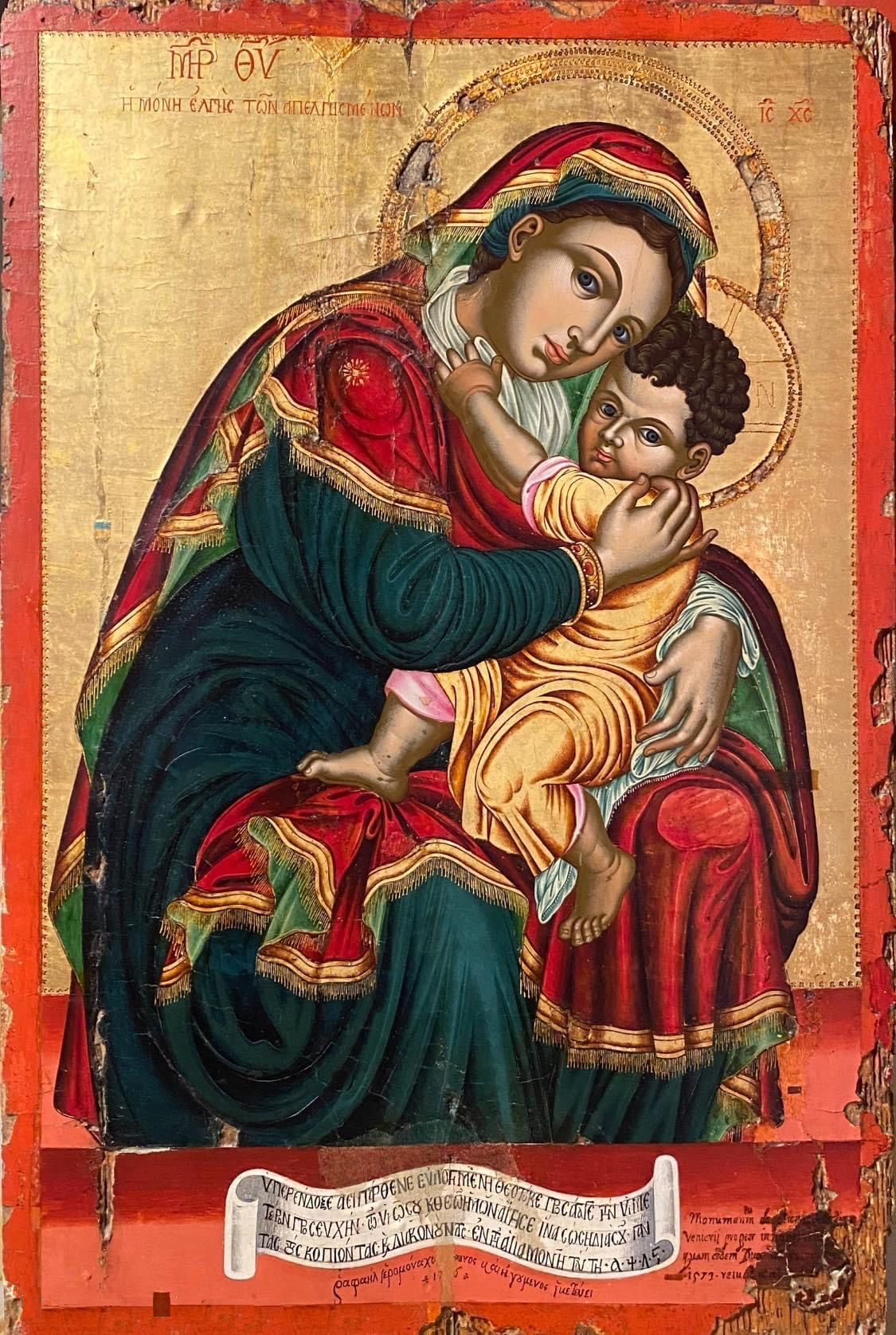
Panagia Samis Karadinos

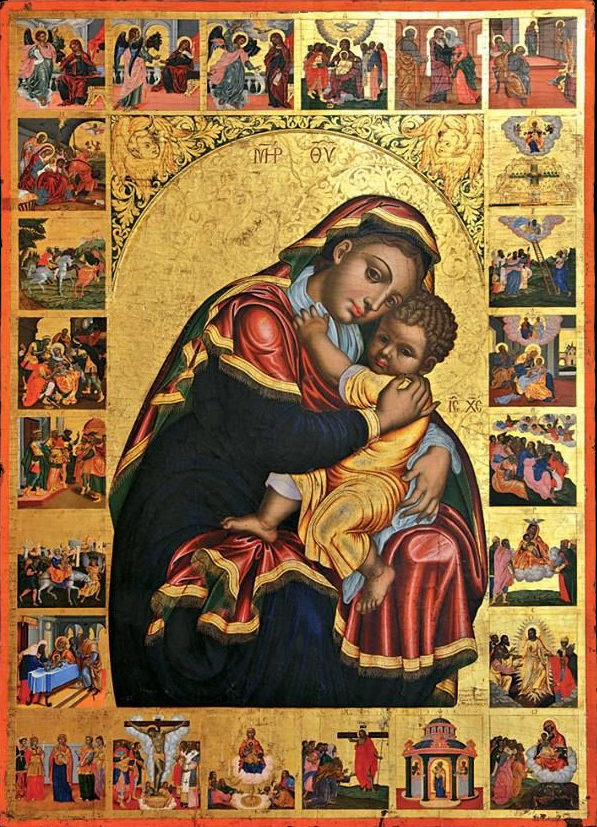
Virgin and Child Tzangarola

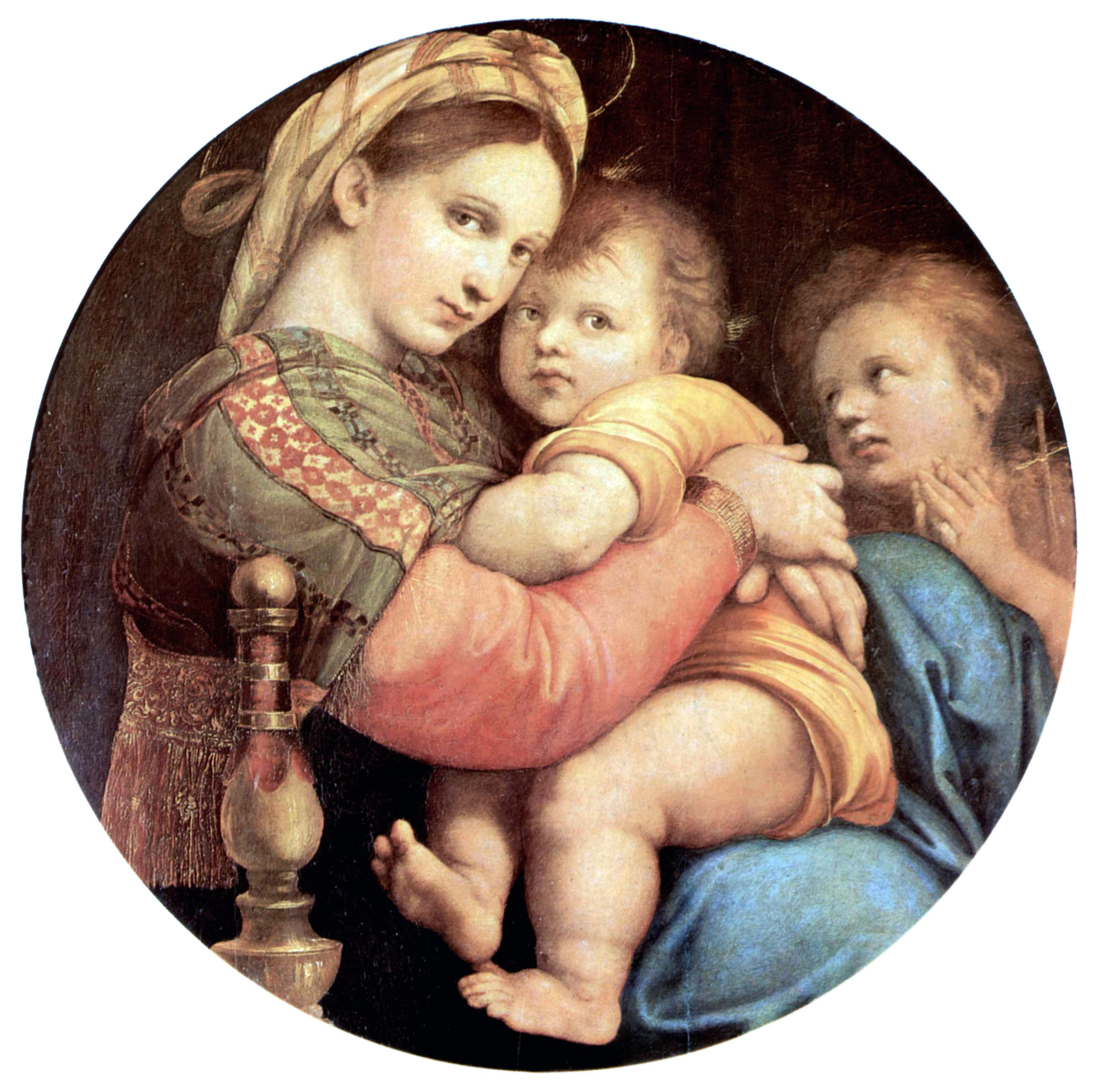
Madonna della seggiola Raphael

== Bibliography ==
- Katselakì, Andromache (1999). Εικόνα Παναγίας Γλυκοφιλούσας από την Κεφαλονιά στο Βυζαντινό Μουσείο [An Icon of the Panagia Glykophilousa from Kephalonia in the Byzantine Museum] (in Greek). Athens: Journal of the Christian Archaeological Society ChAE 20 Period Delta.
