= The Birth of the Virgin Mary (Poulakis) =

Painting by Theodore Poulakis

- Γέννηση της Θεοτόκου (Greek), La nascita della Vergine Maria (Italian)
- Artist: Theodore Poulakis
- Year: c. 1650–1692
- Medium: tempera on wood
- Movement: Heptanese school
- Subject: Nativity of the Virgin
- Dimensions: 57.4 cm × 70 cm (22.6 in × 27.5 in)
- Location: Paul and Alexandra Canellopoulos Museum, Athens, Greece
- Owner: Benaki Museum
- Accession: 298
- Website: Official Website

The Birth of the Virgin Mary was created by Greek painter Theodore Poulakis. Poulakis was originally a painter from Crete who became one of the leading painters of the Greek school known as the Heptanese school working in Venice, Corfu, Cephalonia, and other Ionian Islands during the 17th century. Poulakis studied painting in Venice and eventually became a teacher. He was also affiliated with local politics. The painter heavily integrated the Flemish and Venetian styles into his works significantly advancing the Cretan school of painting which was prevalent two centuries prior to the arrival of the Heptanese school. His catalog of remaining works numbers over 130 and can be mostly found in Greece and Italy.

The birth of the Virgin Mary became a well-known subject in early Greek and Italian painting from the Byzantine Empire and afterward. The birth typically features a younger version of the Virgin Mary and her parents Anna and Joachim. This specific work of art also features Hebrew text. Giotto, Filippo Lippi, and Elias Moskos all feature renditions of the Birth of the Virgin Mary. Poulakis adapted a unique style of painting due to his exposure to Venetian painting and Flemish engravings. The style of work is indicative of Poulakis because he typically used a rectangular canvas where the width of the painting exceeded the height in some of his works. His Nativity of Christ mirrors The Birth of the Virgin and both works feature a similar interior and character placement. The Birth of the Virgin Mary can be found in Athens, Greece at the Paul and Alexandra Canellopoulos Museum while its counterpart The Nativity of Christ is in Venice at the Museo Correr.

== Description ==
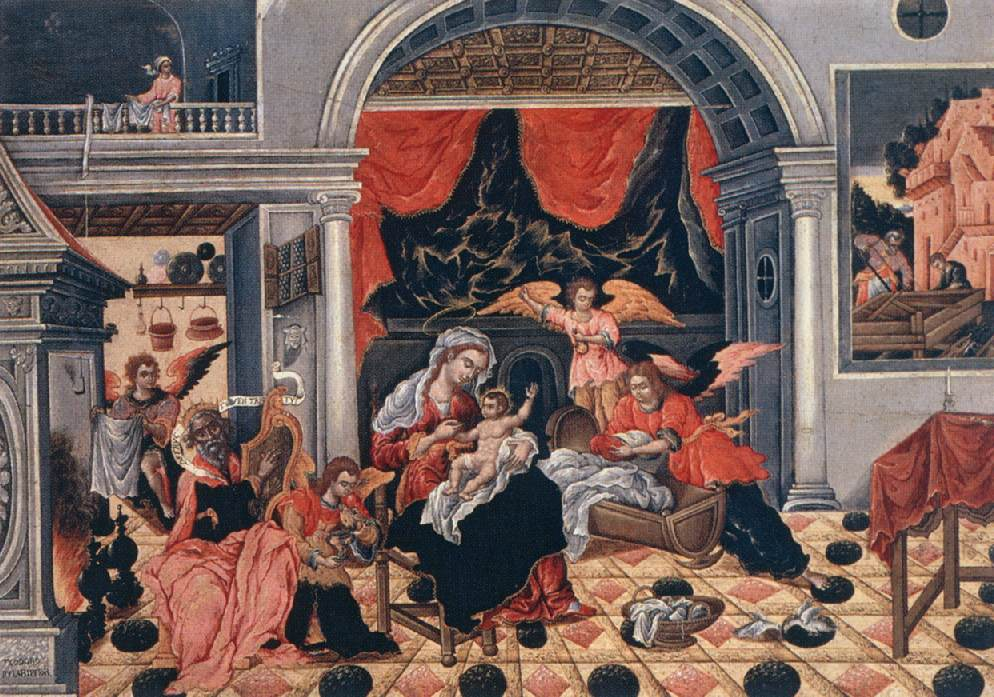
Nativity of Christ by Theodore Poulakis similar to the Birth of the Virgin Mary

The painting is made of egg tempera on a wood panel with a height of 22.6 in (57.4 cm) and a width of 27.5 in (70 cm). The Birth of the Virgin Mary is very similar to Poulakis' Nativity of Jesus in the upper left portion of both works a woman hangs towels and both works feature a central Roman coffered archway followed by a wooden decorative ceiling with square patterns. Martini's Birth of the Virgin also features a Roman coffered archway and a ceiling with square patterns see in the gallery. Also on the left of the painting under the women spreading towels both works feature hot fireplaces, in the Nativity of Jesus an angel warms a towel for baby Jesus while in the Birth of Mary an angel appears above Joachim where he stands over a book with Hebrew text a Greek inscription appears under the window featuring the holy city Jerusalem reading Ο Ιωακείμ (Joachim).

The work features Renaissance architecture and Baroque furniture the space is decorated with elaborate marble floors and the room is saturated with complex geometric shapes. Anna rests on her bed gazing at the young Virgin Mary in her cradle with a gentle expression beneath a drooping tapestry. A woman offers Anna a bird on a plate. Poulakis escaped the boundaries set by the Maniera Greca by introducing more refined figures than the Greek-Italian Byzantine and Cretan Schools. Joachim, Anna and the Young Virgin are distinguished by their golden halos. Above baby Mary lies the Greek inscription ΜΡ ΘΥ Μήτηρ Θεοῦ symbolizing mother of God in Greek also just above Anna's head the Greek word H A Άννα (Saint Anne) the work was also signed by the painter ΧΊΡ ΘΕΌΔώΡᴕ Τᴕ ΠΟΥΛΛΑΚΙ (By the hand of Theodore of Poulaki).

== Gallery ==
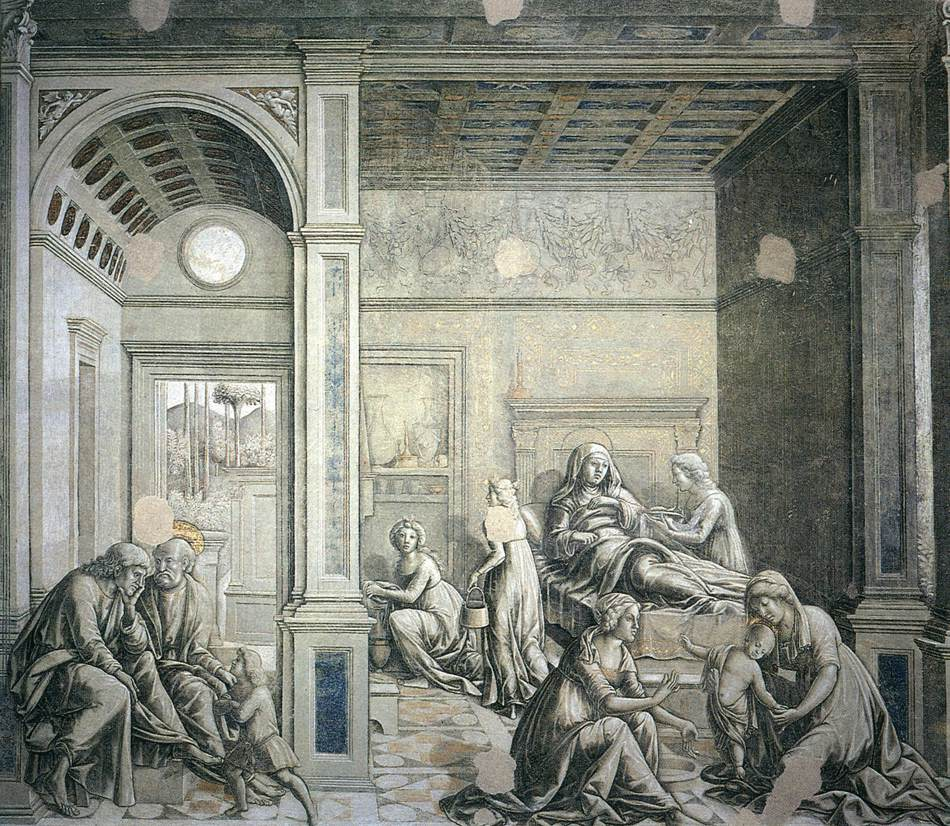
Birth of the Virgin Mary by Francesco di Giorgio Martini

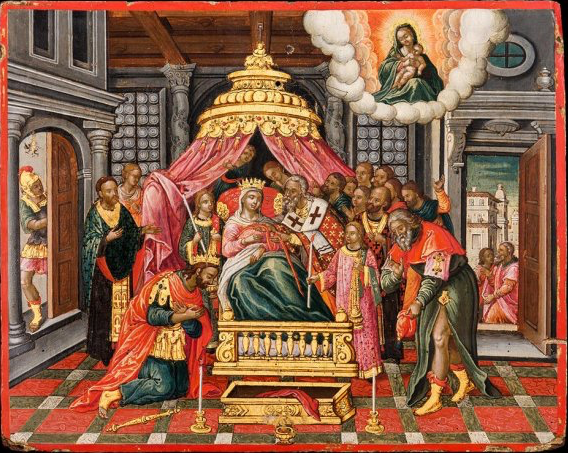
The Miracle of the Holy Belt by Poulakis 1650–1992

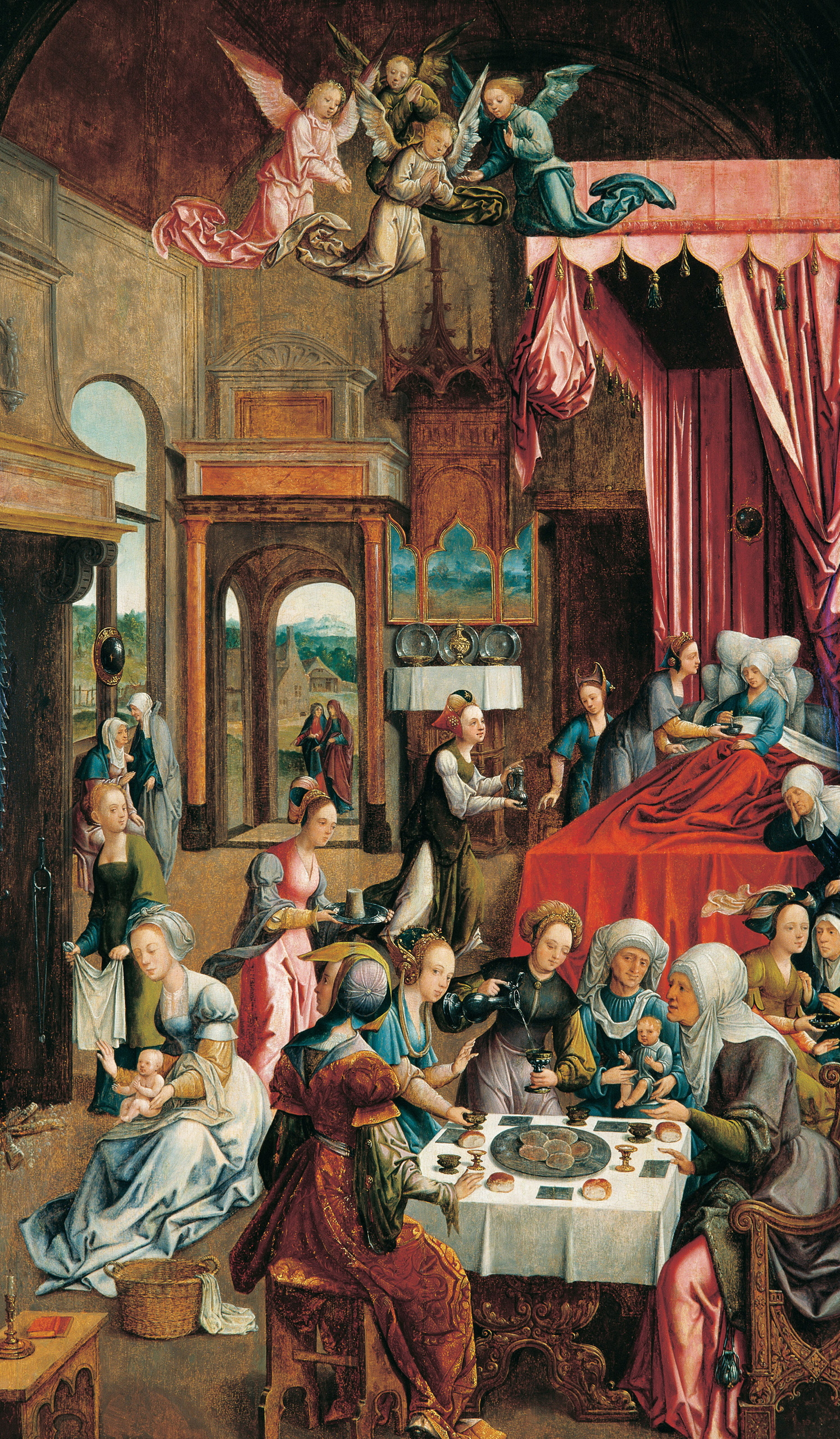
Birth of the Virgin Mary by Jacob Cornelisz van Oostsanen

== Bibliography ==
- Hatzidakis, Manolis; Drakopoulou, Evgenia (1997). Έλληνες Ζωγράφοι μετά την Άλωση (1450–1830). Τόμος 2: Καβαλλάρος – Ψαθόπουλος [Greek Painters after the Fall of Constantinople (1450–1830). Volume 2: Kavallaros – Psathopoulos] (in Greek). Athens: Center for Modern Greek Studies, National Research Foundation. hdl:10442/14088. ISBN 960-7916-00-X.
- Bouskari, Maria S. (2002). Μουσείο Παύλου και Αλεξάνδρας Κανελλοπούλου [Paul and Alexandra Canellopoulos Museum] (PDF) (in Greek). Athens, Greece: Ministry of Culture Archaeological Resources Fund and Expropriations.
