= Museum of Pavlos and Alexandra Kanellopoulou =

Coordinates: 37°58′22.3″N 23°43′33.2″E

Paul and Alexandra Canellopoulos Museum
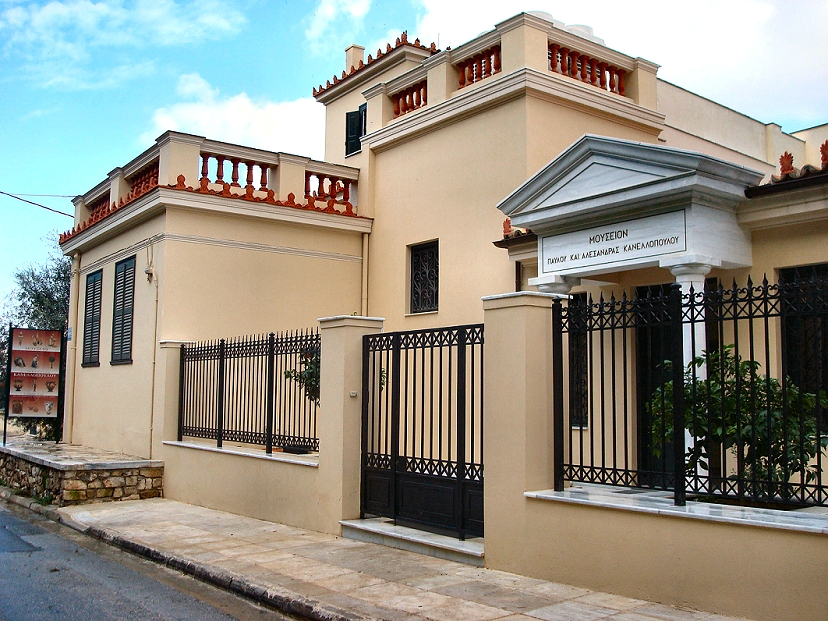
- Established: 1976
- Location: 12 Theorias Str., Plaka, Athens, Greece
- Type: Diachronic museum
- Public transit access: Athens Metro stations: Monastiraki station
- Website: https://camu.gr/

The Paul and Alexandra Canellopoulos Museum is a museum of antiquities in Athens, Greece. It is situated in the north slope of Acropolis, in the district of Plaka (12 Theorias street). Founded in 1976, it houses the collection of Paul and Alexandra Canellopoulos, which started being formed in 1923 and was donated to the Greek state in 1972. The collection features ca. 6500 items of Prehistoric, Ancient Greek, Byzantine and post-Byzantine art, spanning almost six millennia of history (from the Neolithic era to the 19th century).

== The buildings ==
The museum is housed in two buildings, which share a common entrance at Theorias street. The chronologically older building is a neoclassical mansion constructed in 1894 as the residence of the Michaleas family. It has three floors, with beautiful paintings on the ceilings of the upper one. The Michaleas mansion was expropriated by the Greek state in the 1960s-1970s and was restored to permanently house the Canellopoulos collection. In 2007, the New Wing of the Museum was built by the architect P. Kalligas, on the initiative of Alexandra Canellopoulos and the Paul and Alexandra Canellopoulos Foundation.

Archaeological excavations conducted prior to the construction of the New Wing brought to light remains of a Late Byzantine house and part of the medieval fortification of Athens (the so-called Rizokastro), which was built in the 13th century. These remains have been preserved in the basement of the New Wing, and are accessible to the public.

== The collection ==
The Paul and Alexandra Canellopoulos collection comprises ca. 6500 items of Prehistoric, Ancient Greek, Byzantine and Post-Byzantine art. They include Neolithic and Bronze Age figurines and vessels, Classical vases, a wide array of metal artifacts (vases, weapons, statuettes, weights, ritual equipment), marble sculpture, jewelry of all periods (gold, silver, bronze, glass), coins, Fayum-style portraits, textiles, manuscripts, early printed editions, and more than 350 icons dating from the 14th to the 19th century.

Among them, particularly notable is the large group of black-figure and red-figure vases, which depict mythological scenes, rituals and everyday activities of the Archaic and Classical periods. Also important is the large assemblage of Attic white-ground lekythoi, which depict funerary scenes imitating the style of Classical large-scale painting.

The collection is mostly renowned for the fine series of Byzantine and post-Byzantine icons. Special emphasis is laid on the Cretan School of painting, which combined elements of the Byzantine tradition with aspects of the European Renaissance. The collection includes excellent works by the Cretan artists Nicolaos Tzafouris, Michael Damaskenos, Emmanuel Lambardos, Frangias Kavertzas, Ieremias Palladas, Victor, and Emmanuel Tzanes.
