= Adoration of the Shepherds (Tzangarolas) =

Painting by Stephanos Tzangarolas

- Προσκύνηση των Ποιμένων (Greek), Adorazione dei Pastori (Italian)
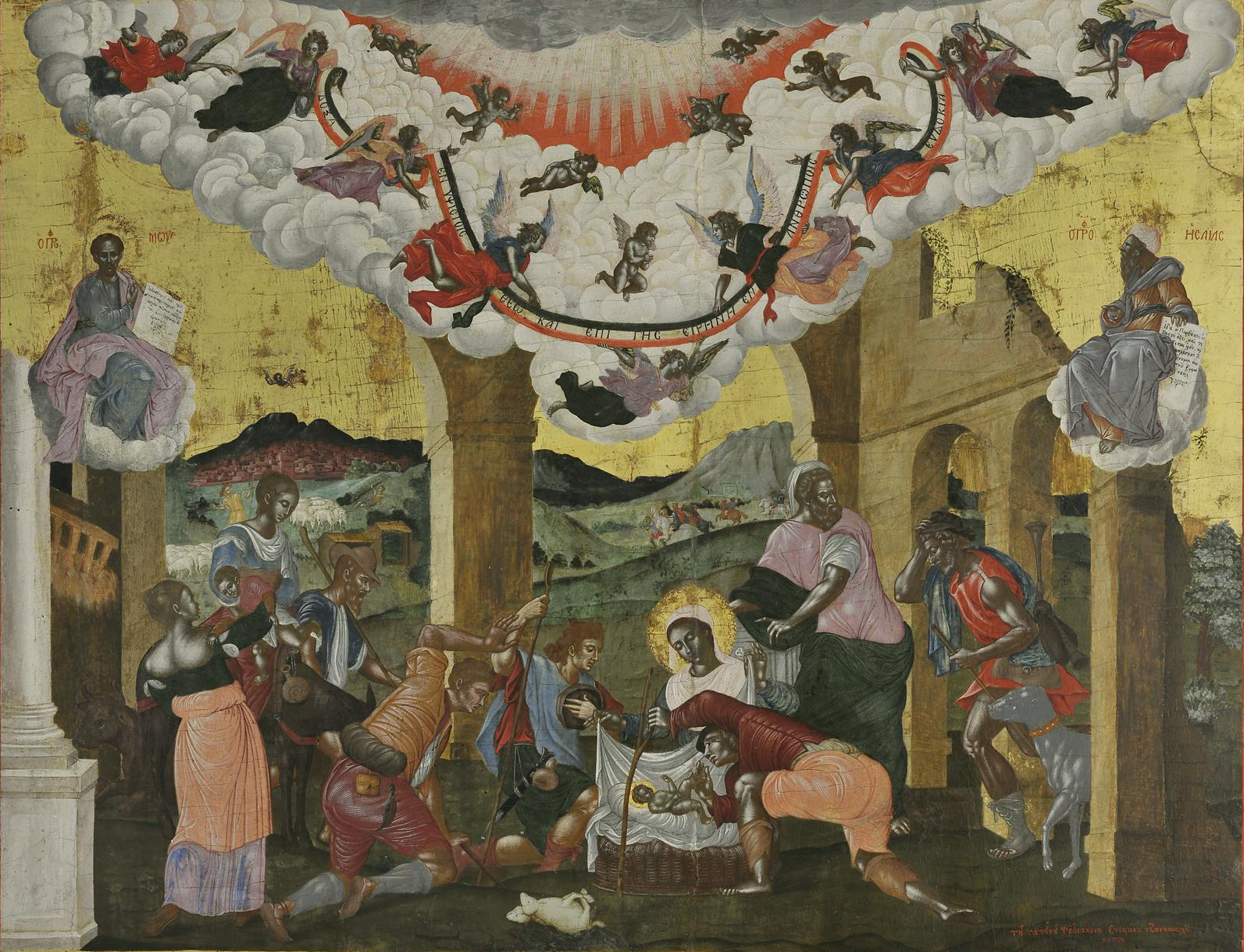
- Artist: Stephanos Tzangarolas
- Year: 1688-1700
- Medium: tempera on wood
- Movement: Heptanese School
- Subject: Adoration of the Shepherds
- Dimensions: 98 cm × 80 cm (38.6 in × 31.5 in)
- Location: National Gallery of Athens, Athens, Greece
- Owner: National Gallery of Athens
- Website: Official Website

Adoration of the Shepherds is a tempera painting created by Greek painter Stephanos Tzangarolas. The painter was originally from Crete. He was a member of a wealthy Cretan family. He was a teacher and priest. He signed most of his works. He migrated to Corfu. His work period was from 1675 to 1710. He was active during the Greek Baroque period. 22 of his works survived. He was a prominent member of the Heptanese School.

Painters of the late Cretan School and the Heptanese School used engravings as inspiration for their works. Cornelis Cort was a Dutch engraver from the Netherlands. He was active in the city of Hoorn. His works were printed in Antwerp. He eventually migrated to Venice. He was associated with the famous Venetian painter Titian. He converted many works into engravings. Cornelis Cort turned one of Federico Zuccari's frescos into an engraving. The fresco was called The Annunciation with Prophets and Music-Making Angels. The fresco was commissioned by the Collegio Romano for the Jesuit church of Santa Maria Annunziata in Rome, but was destroyed in 1626. It was eventually turned into an engraving. Tzangarola was exposed to the work.

He was inspired by the masterpiece. He created a unique work of art. The artist historically communicated the usage of engravings by integrating the coloration of the actual engravings in his work. The artist intentionally mixed black and white coloration creating a unique grey chrome-like blend of colors. The style is reminiscent of the technique used by Vincenzo Foppa. The figures look as if they are from an engraving. The work of art does not fall into a specific category. It was part of the experimentation of artists belonging to the Heptanese School. The work is part of the collection of the National Gallery of Athens.

== Description ==
The materials used for the work were tempera paint, gold leaf, and wood. The height of the work is 98 cm (38.6 in.) and the width is 80 cm (31.5 in.). The painter created a unique work. He imported some of the figures from the Cornelis Cort engraving. Four figures were directly similar. David, Moses, Isaiah and Solomon. There are eight figures total. Starting from the top, three figures appear. From left to right Matthew appears holding a scroll. He is also with his symbol the winged angel. In the center David plays the harp. To the right, John writes the Book of Revelation. His symbol the eagle is also present. In the center, two figures appear slightly below the clouds starting from left to right Moses holds his sacred tablet, and Isaiah peers up at the angels. The final three figures at the bottom are from left to right Luke the Evangelist. He appears holding a scroll. He is seated on a cloud with his symbol the cow. In the center Solomon appears crowned. Finally, in the lower right-hand corner, the patron saint of Venice Mark is present with his symbol the Lion of Venice.

== Gallery ==
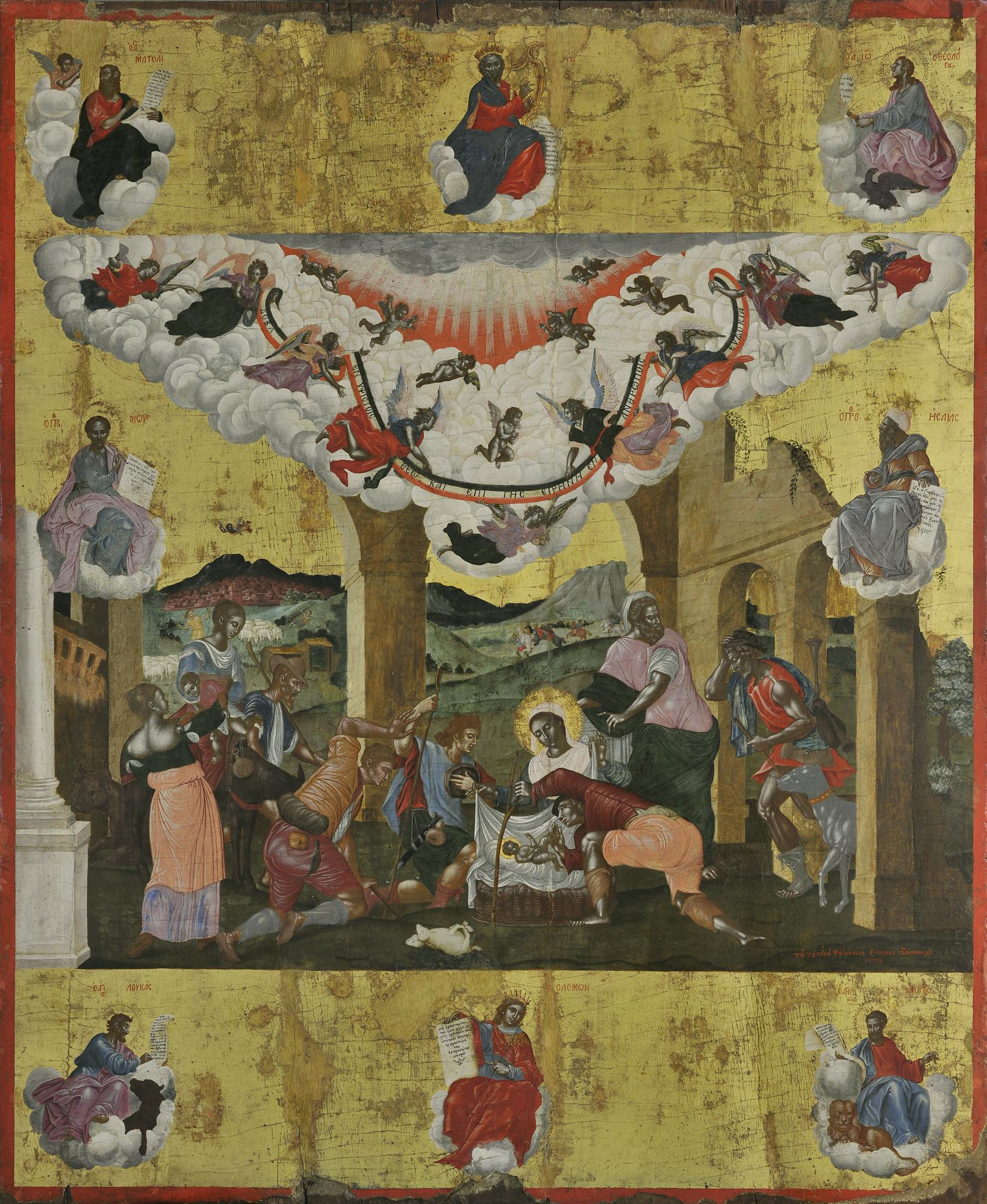
Full Adoration of the Shepherds

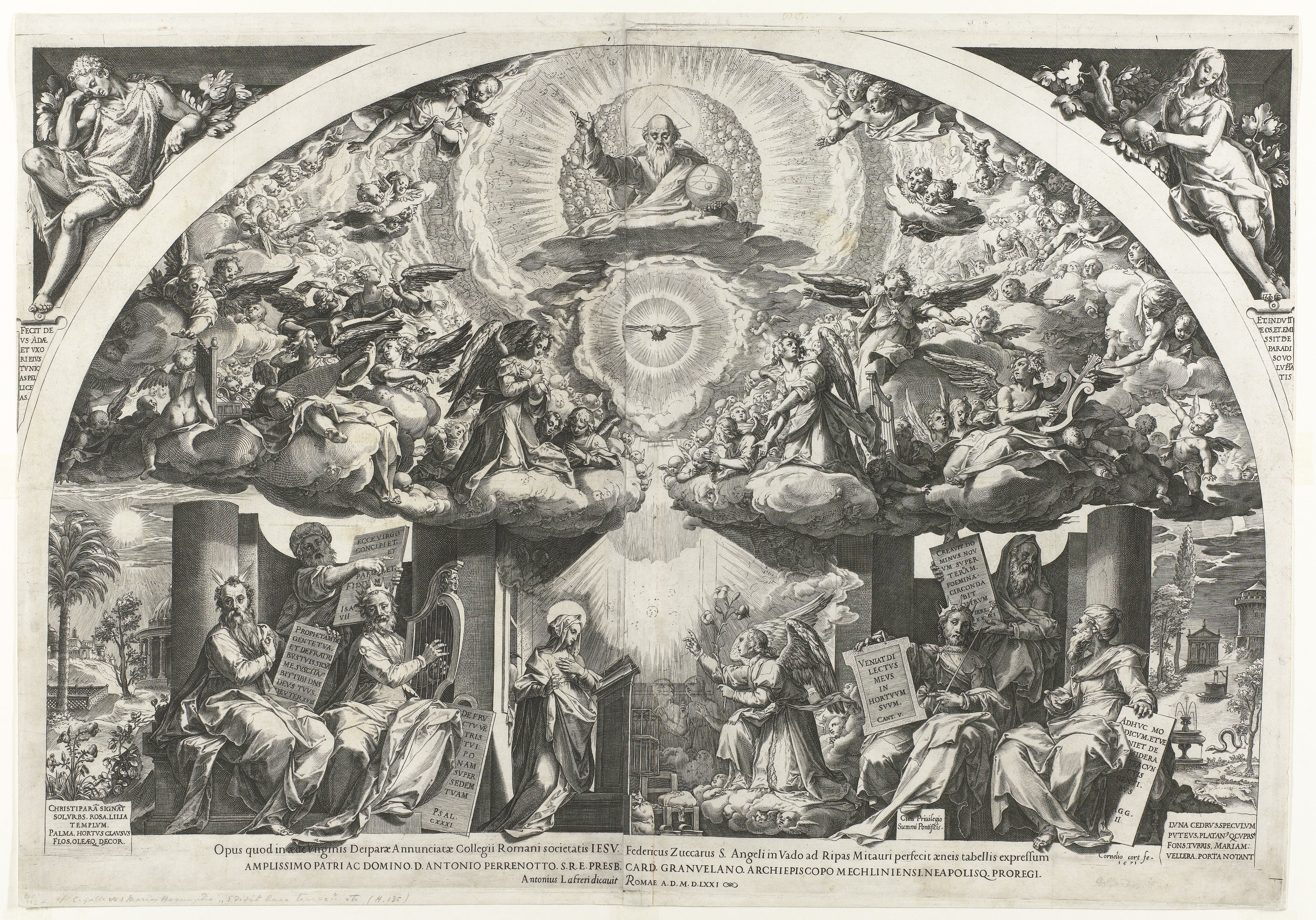
Prophets and Music-Making Angels Cort

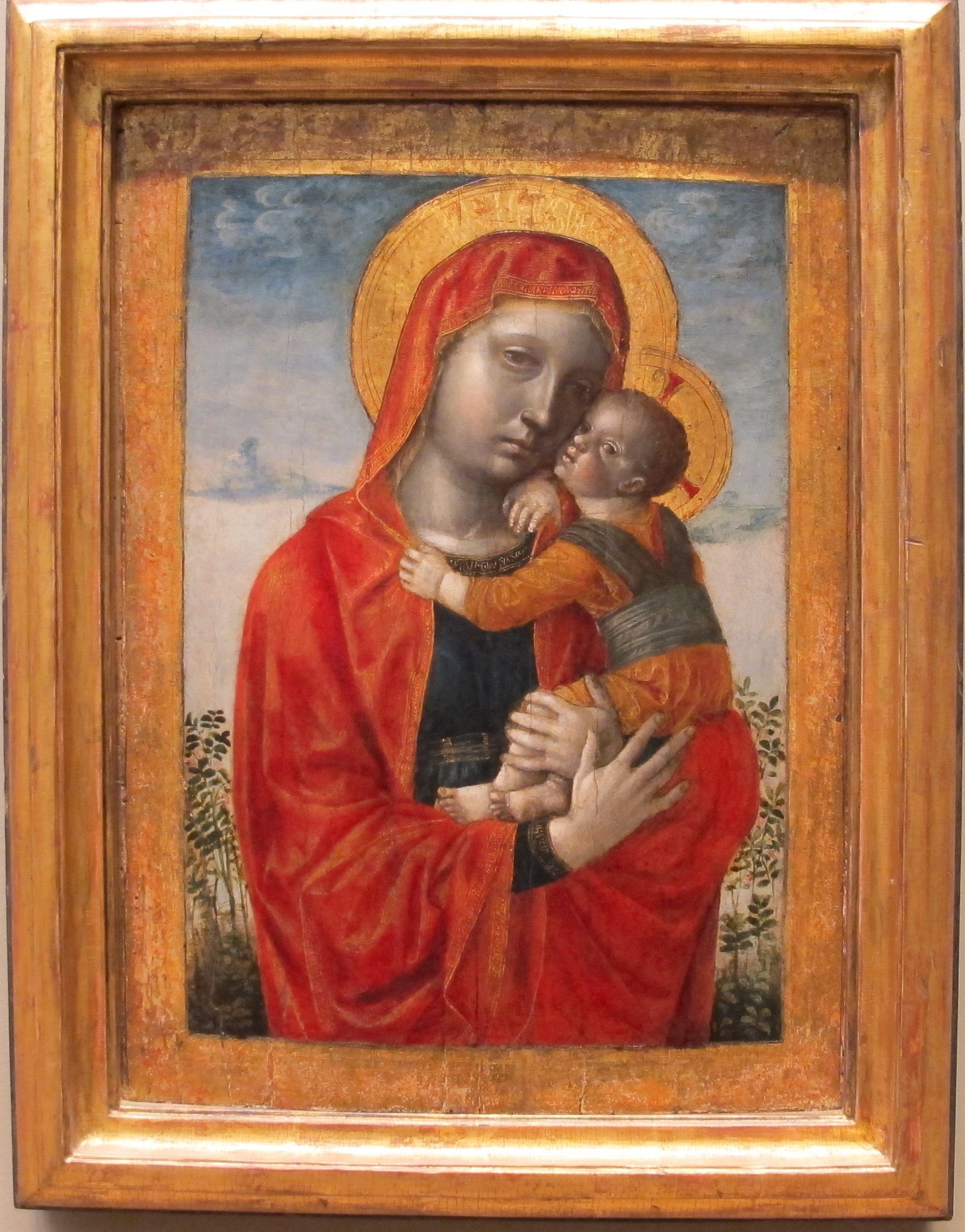
Grey Madonna Foppa

== Bibliography ==
- Hatzidakis, Manolis; Drakopoulou, Evgenia (1997). Έλληνες Ζωγράφοι μετά την Άλωση (1450-1830). Τόμος 2: Καβαλλάρος - Ψαθόπουλος [Greek Painters after the Fall of Constantinople (1450-1830). Volume 2: Kavallaros - Psathopoulos]. Athens: Center for Modern Greek Studies, National Research Foundation. hdl:10442/14088. ISBN 960-7916-00-X.
- Kalligas, Marinos (1984). Ελληνες ζωγραφοι στην Εθνικη Πινακοθηκη μια Επιλογη [Greek painters at the National Gallery a Selection]. Athens: Dodoni Publications. pp. 57–58.
