= Andreas Karantinos =

Greek painter (1680–1740)

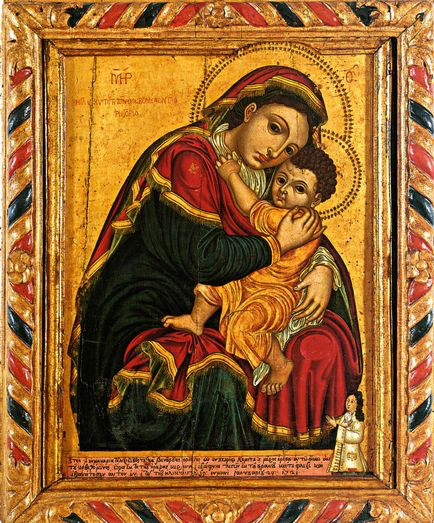
- Virgin Glykofilousa
- Born: 1680; Kefalonia
- Died: 1740 (aged 59–60); Kefalonia
- Education: Apprentice to Stephanos Tzangarolas
- Known for: Painting and goldsmith
- Movement: Heptanese school Neo-Hellenikos Diafotismos; Greek Rococo
- Elected: Archpresbyter

Andreas Karantinos (Greek: Ανδρέας Καραντινός; 1680 – 1740), also known as Andreas Karandinos, was a Greek Renaissance painter, educator and goldsmith. He was from Kefalonia. He was a member of the Heptanese school. His artwork is reflective of the time period. His teacher was famous painter Stephanos Tzangarolas. He adapted his style. Karandinos also emulated the Cretan masters such as Michael Damaskinos. Many Greek painters emulated one other. Karandinos also taught famous Greek painter Konstantinos Kokkinos and several others. Many of his works are in Greece mostly on the island of Kefalonia. Twenty two of his work survived and one fresco. The fresco is of the Second Coming or the Last Judgement. The fresco is located in the church of Evagelastria in Kastro Kefalonia.

== History ==
Karantinos was born in Kefalonia. He was a monk. His family migrated from the mainland towns Methoni and Koroni. They were refugees. His teacher was famous painter Stephanos Tzangarolas. Around 1712, he was no longer a monk and in 1716 he stopped being a regular priest. According to records on the island of Kefalonia in 1719, he purchased a property.

Records also indicate he was a candidate for the throne of Archbishop of Kefalonia. In 1735, he was paid for an icon of the Virgin Mary by the church of Sisiotissa in Argostoli. Four years later in 1739, he was hired to gild parts of the monastery of Sision with gold. An inscription on the Holy Table at the church of Agios Spyridon in Kefalonia details a history of his life. He held the title of archpresbyter. The archpresbyter held supervisory duties over a number of parishes. The inscription on the Holy Table also recorded the date of his death.

His most notable painting is The Allegory of the Holy Communion. Another impressive piece is his Virgin Glykofilousa. The painting is very similar to Virgin and Child by the master Stephanos Tzangarolas. The painting serves as a historical recording of Bernardo (Vernardo) Aninou. The bottom of the painting has a three-line inscription and the date of his death. The figure at the bottom is Bernardo (Vernardo) Aninou. Masaccio and Franghias Kavertzas have similar figures in their paintings. The patrons of Masaccio's Holy Trinity are featured to the left and right kneeling down. In the Franghias Kavertzas a nun is featured at the bottom of the Last Judgment. She was also the patron of the masterpiece.

== Gallery ==
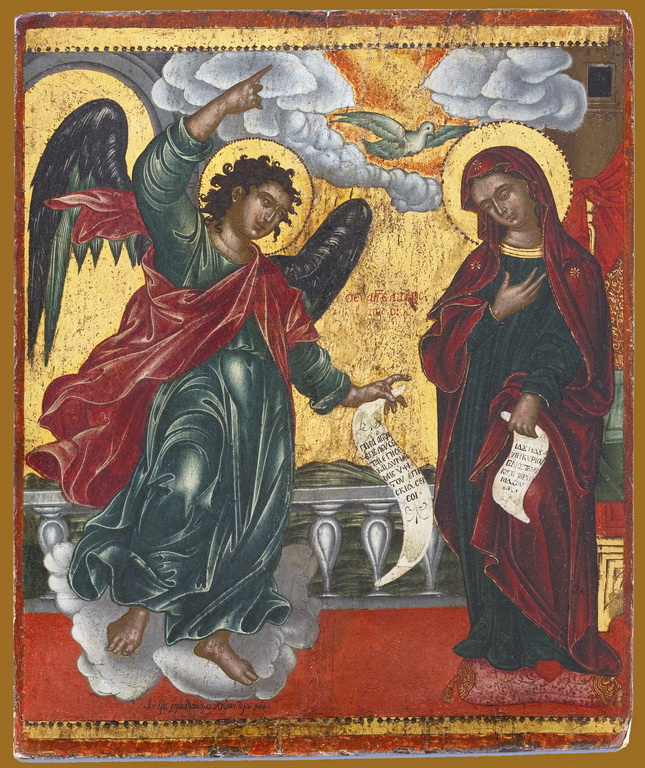
Annunciation

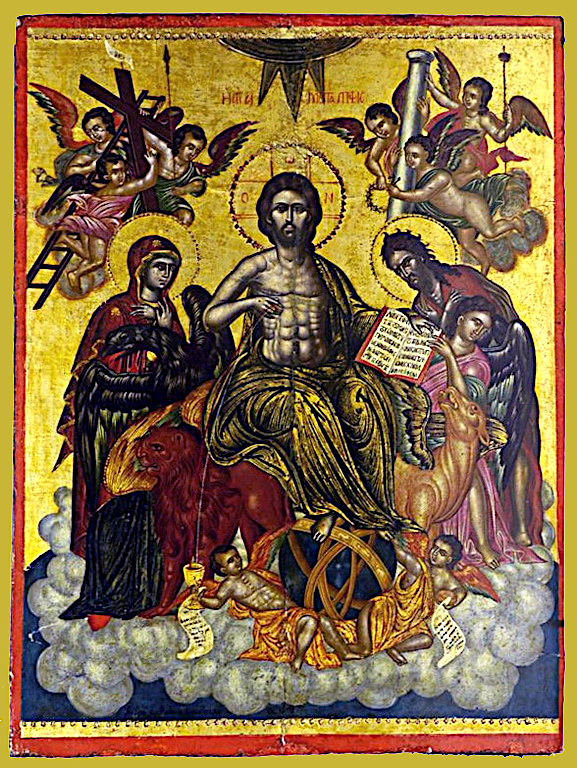
The Allegory of the Holy Communion

== Notable works ==
- XC High Priest 1721 Korgialenio Historic And Cultural Museum Argostoli
- Virgin And Child 1721 Korgialenio Historic And Cultural Museum Argostoli
- Virgin Glykofilousa (Karantinos)

== See also ==
- Lorenzo Ghiberti
- Neilos
- Makarios (painter)

== Bibliography ==
- Hatzidakis, Manolis (1987). Greek painters after the fall (1450-1830) Volume A. Athens, GR: Center for Modern Greek Studies E.I.E.
- Hatzidakis, Manolis & Drakopoulou, Eugenia (1997). Greek painters after the fall (1450-1830) Volume B. Athens, GR: Center for Modern Greek Studies E.I.E.
- Drakopoulou, Eugenia (2010). Greek painters after the fall (1450-1830) Volume C. Athens, GR: Center for Modern Greek Studies E.I.E.
