= Stephanos Tzangarolas =

Greek painter

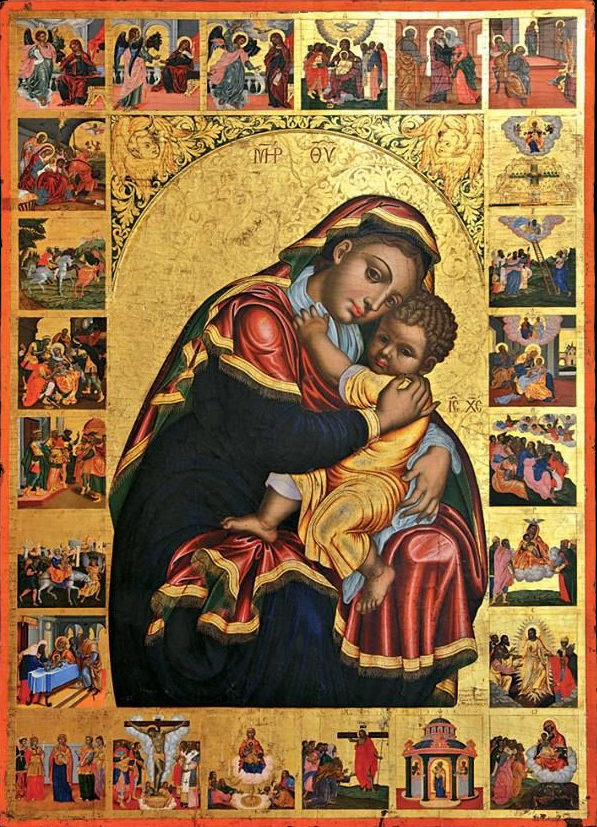
- Virgin and Child
- Born: 1660-1675; Crete, Greece
- Died: 1710; Corfu
- Known for: Iconography and hagiography
- Movement: Cretan School; Heptanese School

Stephanos Tzangarolas (Greek: Στέφανος Τζαγκαρόλας, 1660-1675 – 1710) also known as Stephano Tzangarola. He was a Greek painter during the late Cretan Renaissance. He migrated from Crete to the island of Corfu. He is a member of the Heptanese School and the Cretan Renaissance. His contemporaries at the time were Panagiotis Doxaras, Theodore Poulakis and Elias Moskos. His artwork began to reflect the transition of the classical maniera greca of Crete to the more refined style of the Ionian Islands. His style resembles the transition of Gentile da Fabriano and Fra Angelico from the maniera greca to their respective styles. Tzangarolas paintings influenced countless artists both Italian and Greek. Some artists that reflect his style include Spyridon Sperantzas and Georgios Kastrofylakas. His paintings can be found all over Greece mainly Athens and the Ionian Islands. Some of his work is in Cairo and London. His student was famous Greek painter Andreas Karantinos.

== History ==
Tzangarolas was born on the island of Crete. He was from a wealthy Cretan family. He migrated to Corfu. He was a priest. Records indicate the first church he worked at was Holy Trinity Church in 1680. He signed most of his paintings. Historians used his work to establish a timeline. By 1688, he was a Deacon, and in 1700, he was ordained a priest. Records exist until 1710. He also taught famous painter Andreas Karantinos.

His style evolved and Tzangarolas was a member of the Heptanese School while Greece was undergoing the Greek Rococo and the Modern Greek Enlightenment in art also known as Neo-Hellenikos Diafotismos. According to the Institute of Neohellenic Research twenty-two of his paintings have survived and most of them are signed. Here are some examples of his signature: χειρί Σπυρίδωνος Τζακαρόλου, ποίημα ιεροδιακόνου Στεφάνου Τζανκαρόλα. His most notable painting was the Virgin and Child painted in 1700 and featured twenty-four stanzas of the Acathist Hymn around a central image of the Madonna. It is located at the Monastery of St. Andrew and Ecclesiastical Museum, Thessaloniki Greece

== Gallery ==
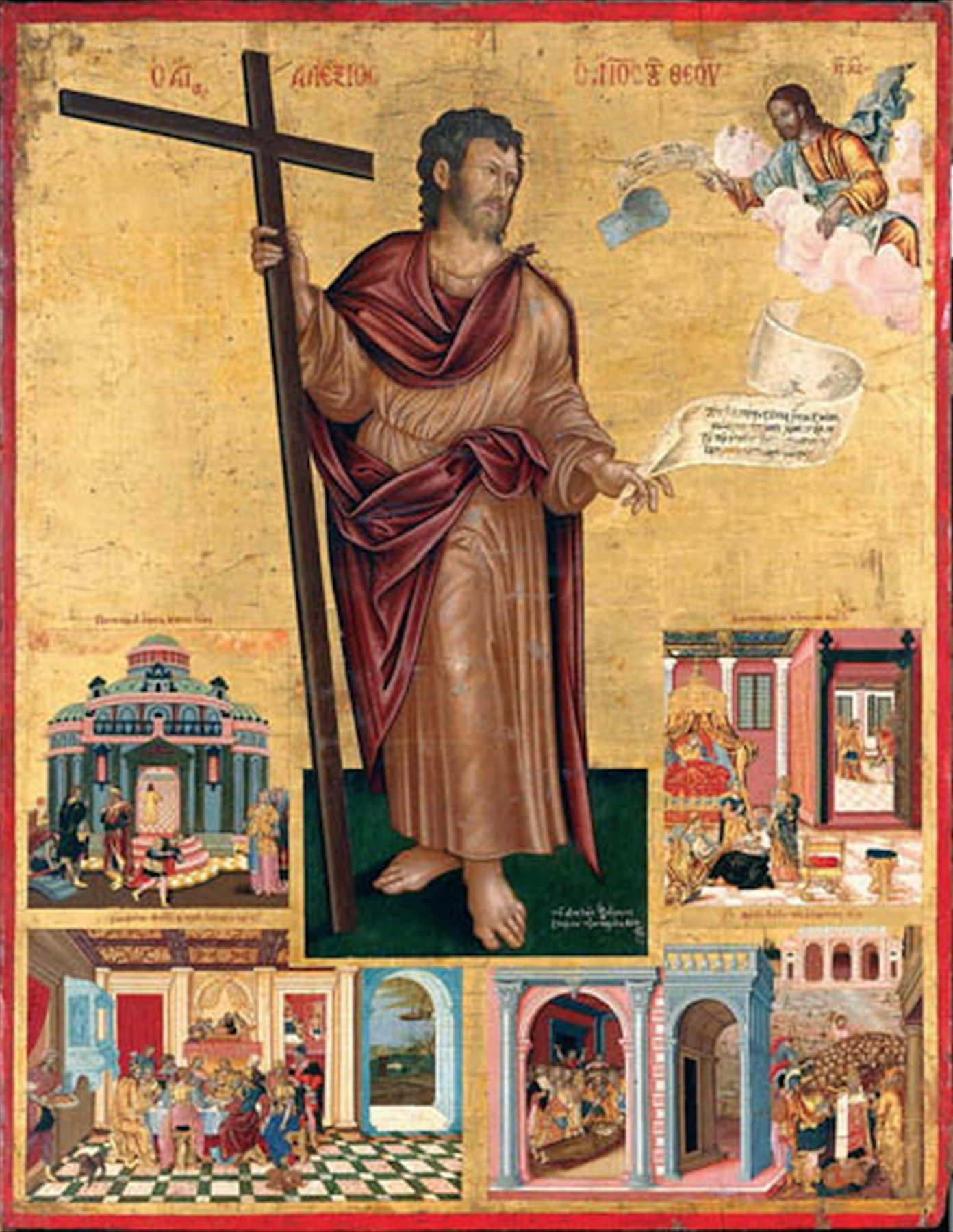
Saint Alexis

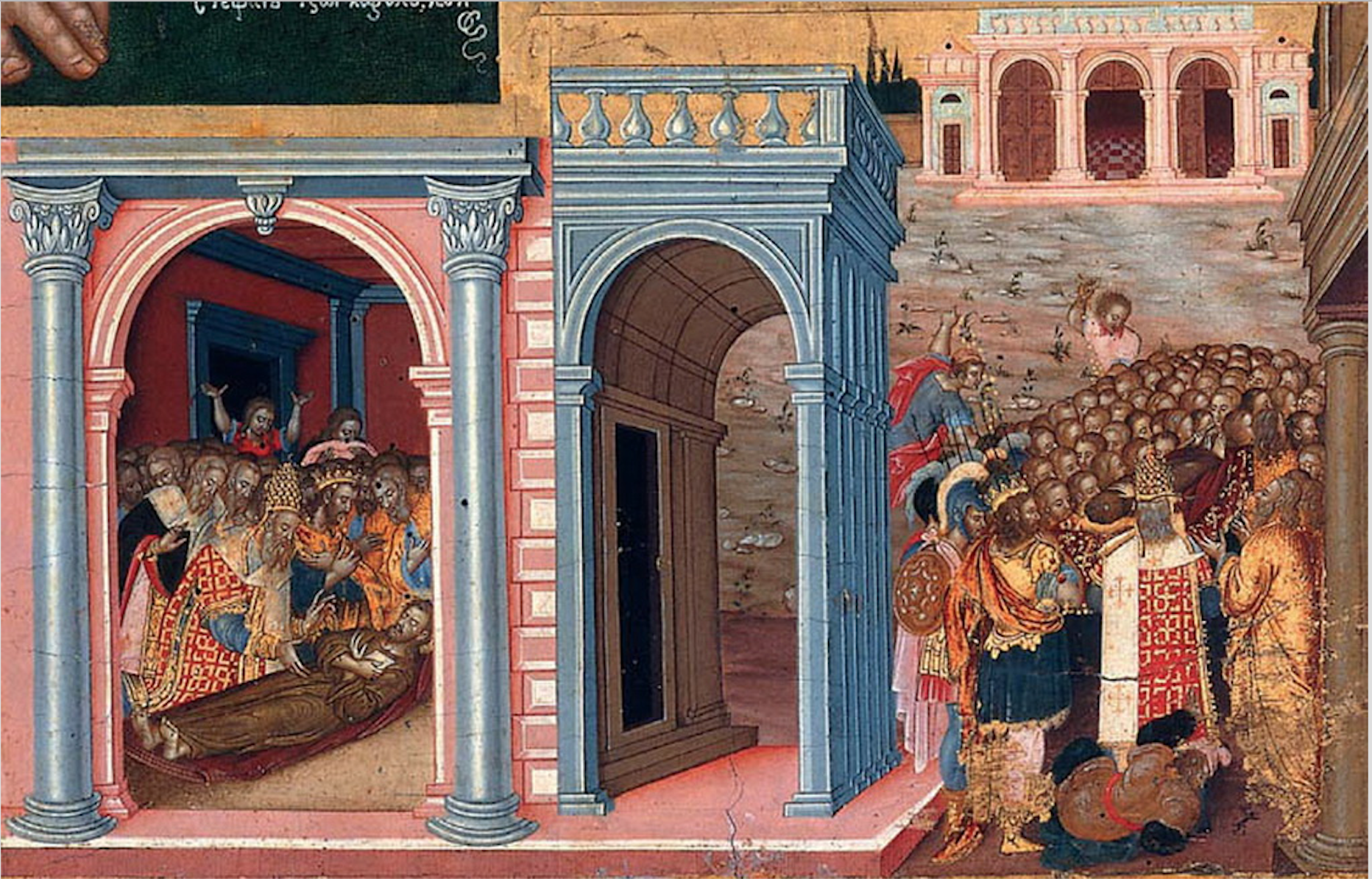
Saint Alexis Detail

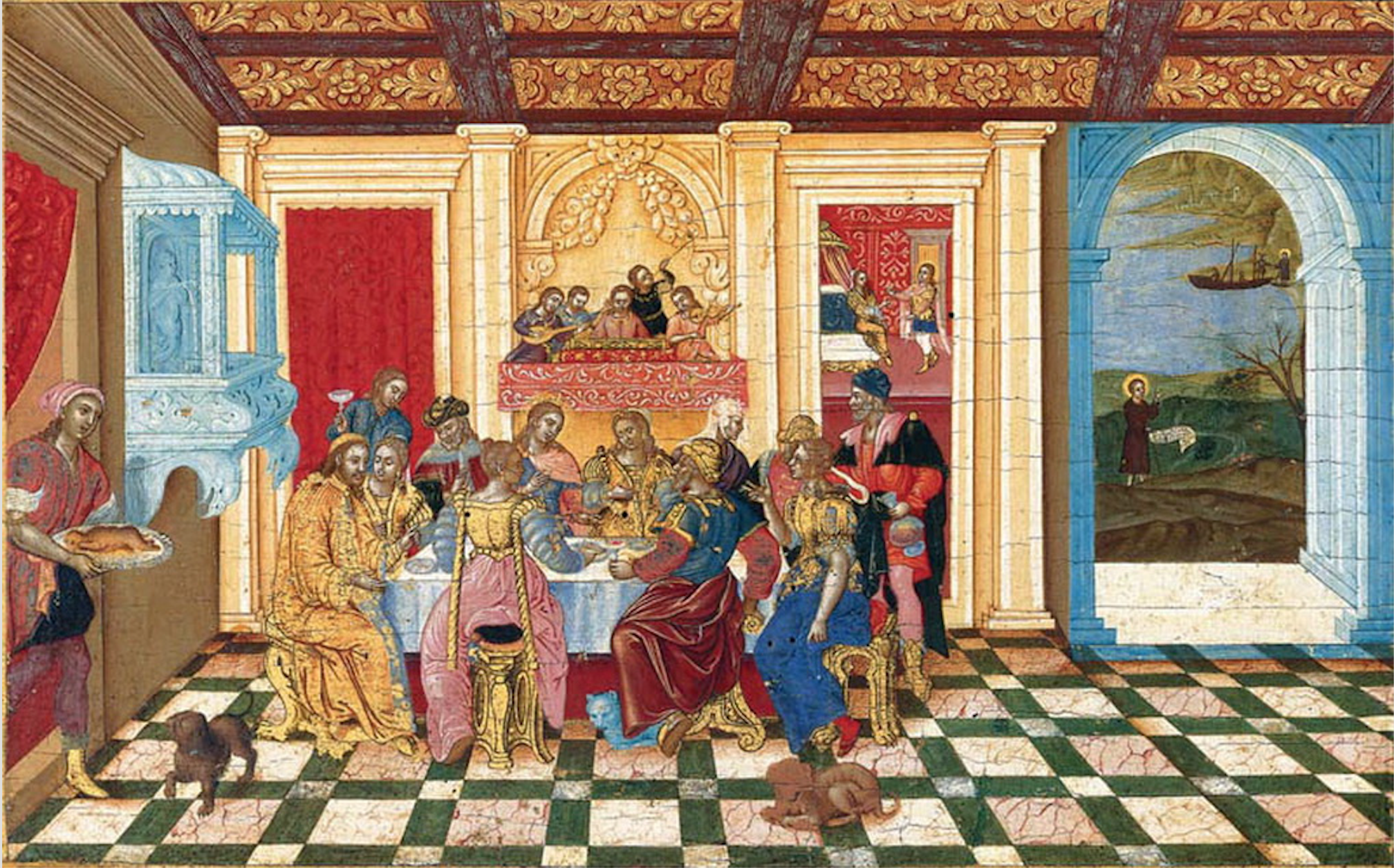
Saint Alexis Detail

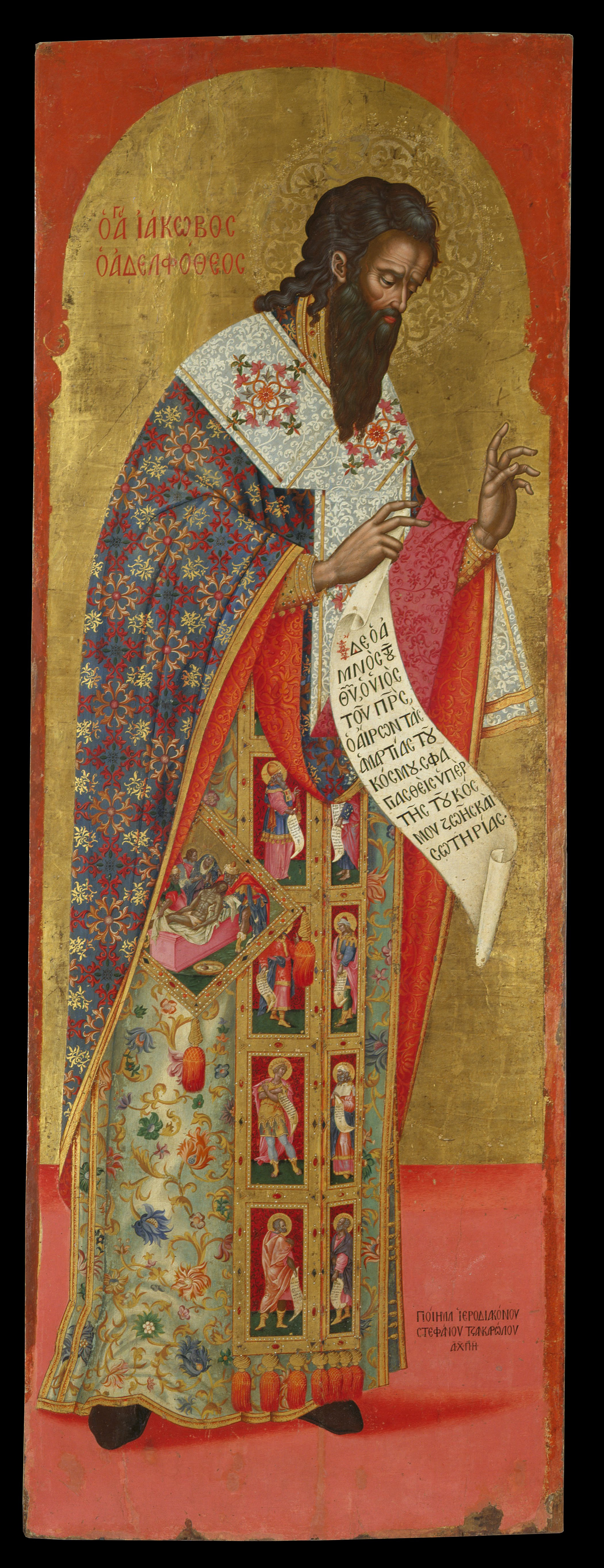
St James

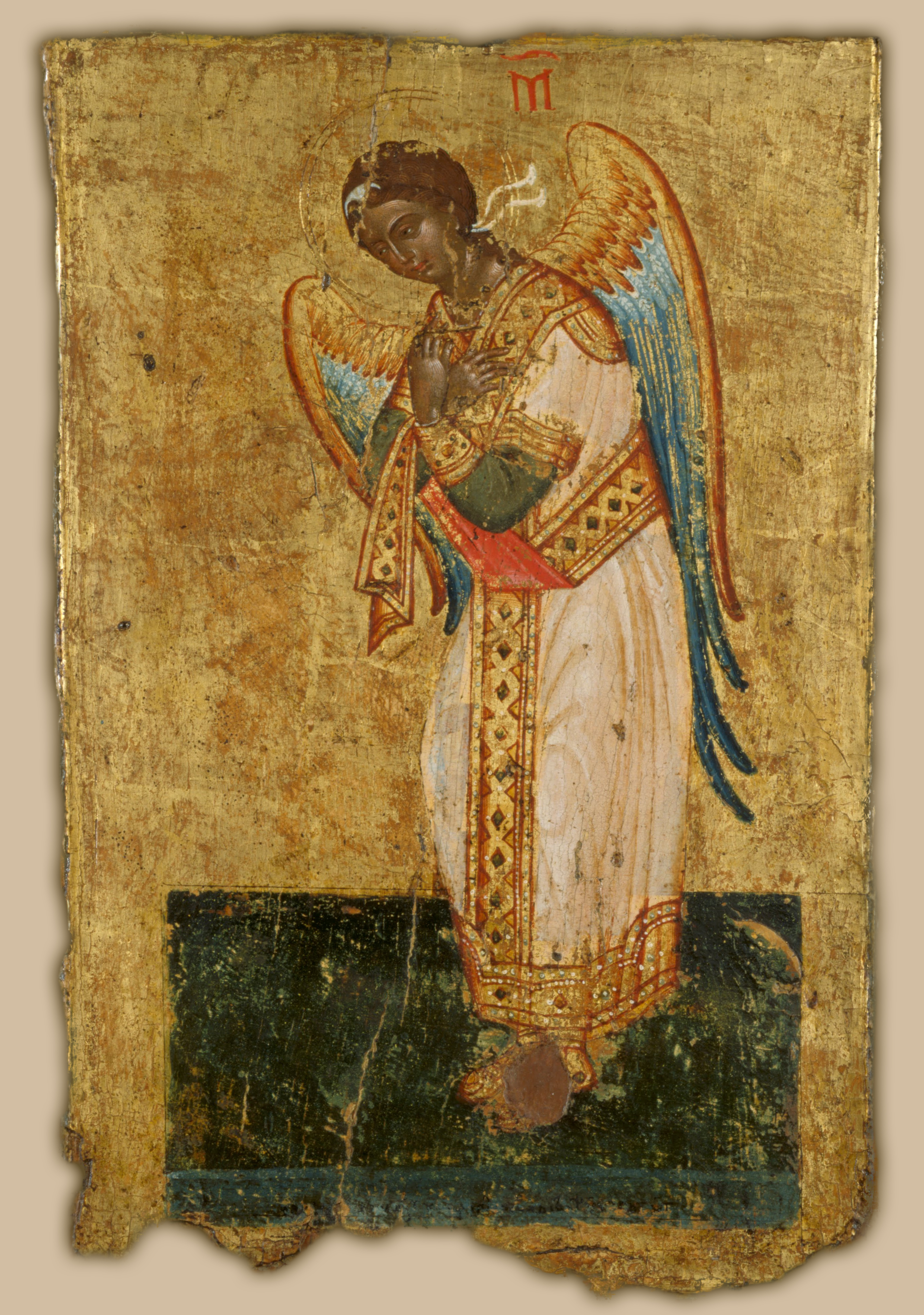
Archangel Michael

== Notable works ==
- Jesus Behold the Man, Cairo, Egypt
- Holy Trinity Cairo, Egypt
- Adoration of the Shepherds, Athens, Greece

== Bibliography ==
- Hatzidakis, Manolis (1987). Greek painters after the fall (1450-1830) Volume A. Athens, GR: Center for Modern Greek Studies E.I.E.
- Hatzidakis, Manolis & Drakopoulou, Eugenia (1997). Greek painters after the fall (1450-1830) Volume B. Athens, GR: Center for Modern Greek Studies E.I.E.
- Drakopoulou, Eugenia (2010). Greek painters after the fall (1450-1830) Volume C. Athens, GR: Center for Modern Greek Studies E.I.E.
