= Collegiate church of Sant'Esuperanzio, Cingoli =

Roman Catholic collegiate church in Marche, Italy

Coordinates: 43°22′38″N 13°12′50″E

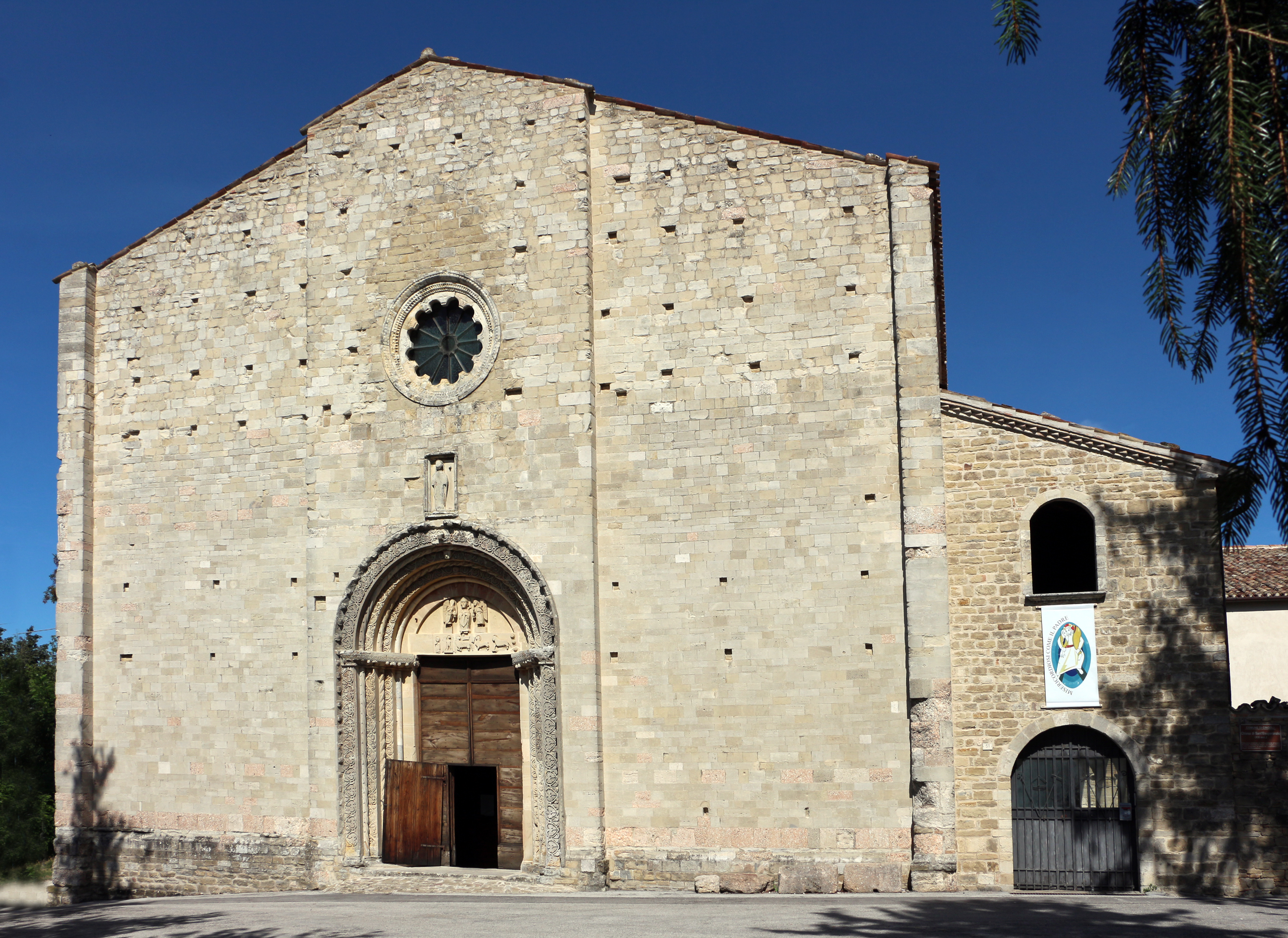
Sant'Esuperanzio (Cingoli)

The Collegiata di San Esuperanzio is a late-Romanesque and early-Gothic-style, Roman Catholic collegiate church located on Via Sant'Esuperanzio, just northwest of the historic center of the town of Cingoli, province of Macerata, region of Marche, Italy. It is located some 300 meters north of the tip of the historic center. The road leading the Collegiata continues on to the main cemetery of the town.

== History ==
The collegiate is first documented by 1139, when the property was assigned by Pope Innocent III to monks of the Fonte Avellana abbey. By the 13th-century, the church was dedicated to St Esuperanzio, patron and former bishop of Cingoli. The present church was rebuilt in this era in limestone and pink marble in a late-Romanesque and early-Gothic-styles.

The façade was intended to be sheathed in decorative marble, but remains unfinished in stone bricks. It has a small but delicate rose window in the center, and a single portal with a concave recession of a series of columns with a rounded arch. In the lunette is a sculpted image of the holy bishop Esuperanzio with angels. In the architrave are symbols of the evangelists and a gothic inscription. The work is attribute to a Master Giacomo of Cingoli, who also appears to have worked in the church of Santa Maria della Castellaretta and San Francesco in Staffolo, as well as San Francesco and San Nicolò in Cingoli. To the right side of the church is the prior with three arches supporting a loggia.

The interior is characterized by pointed gothic arches supporting the roof. The presbytery is raised to accommodate a crypt that held the relics of the Saint and attendant monks. One of the pillars in the presbytery has a 14th century seal carved in the sandstone with the words Sigillum Sanctae Crucis Fontis avellanae, referring to the abbey.

The interior has remnants of early frescoes, that encompassed the chapels erected by local aristocratic families that were found between the pillars. Two survive more intact that the others, the chapel of the Silvestri on the left, and of the Simonetti with Renaissance style altars and candelabra. The Simonetti chapel also has a 13th-century painted wooden crucifix. The church also contains a polyptych attributed to Giovanni Antonio Bellinzoni da Pesaro and an altarpiece depicting the Flagellation attributed to Sebastiano del Piombo.
