= Musone =

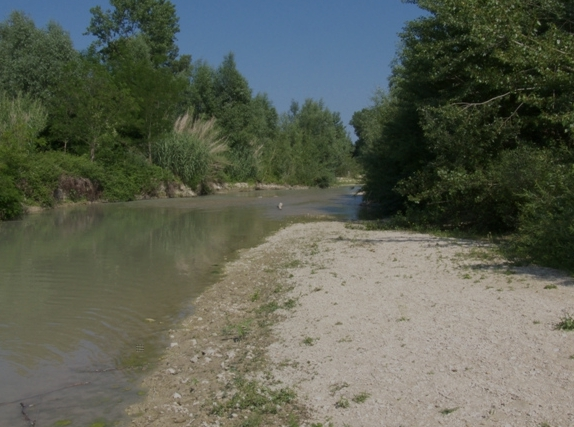
- The river at Osimo

Location
- Country: Italy

Physical characteristics
- Source
  - location: Province of Macerata
  - elevation: 775 m (2,543 ft)
- Mouth: Adriatic Sea
  - coordinates: 43.4739°N 13.6419°E
- Length: 76 km (47 mi)
- Basin size: 642 km^{2} (248 sq mi)
- Discharge
  - average: 6.4 m^{3}/s (230 cu ft/s)

The Musone (Latin: Misco) is a river in the Marche region of Italy. The source of the river is east of Matelica and south of Monte San Vicino in the province of Macerata. The river flows northeast near Apiro, Cingoli and Staffolo before crossing into the province of Ancona near Filottrano. The river then flows northeast and is joined by a tributary south of Osimo before curving northeast near Loreto. Finally, the river empties into the Adriatic Sea north of Porto Recanati and south of Numana.
