= Cingoli Cathedral =

Roman Catholic cathedral in Marche, Italy

Coordinates: 43°22′25″N 13°12′59″E

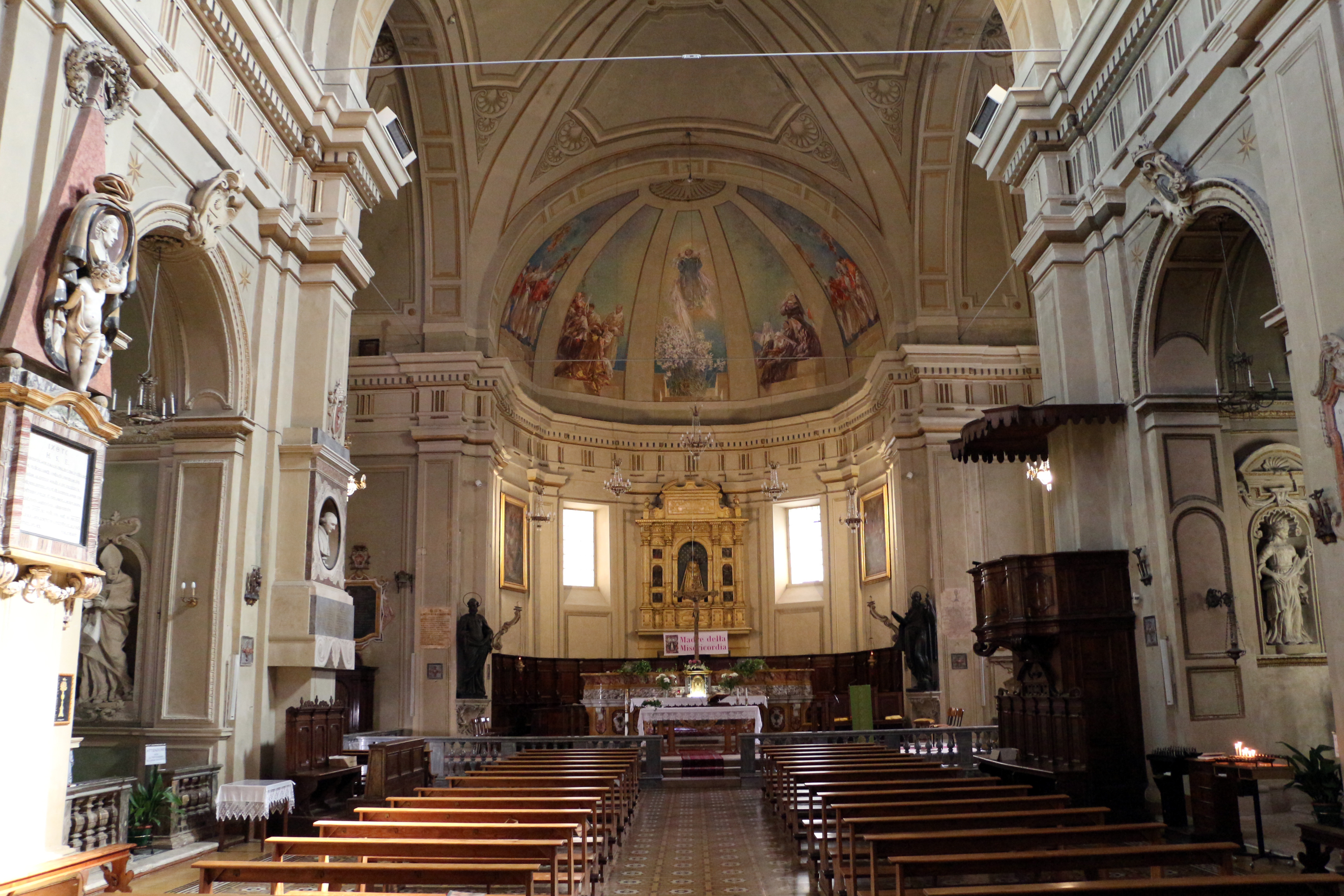
Interior

Cingoli Cathedral (Italian: Cattedrale di Cingoli; Duomo di Cingoli; Cattedrale di Santa Maria Assunta) is a Baroque Roman Catholic cathedral dedicated to the Assumption of the Virgin Mary in the town of Cingoli, province of Macerata, region of Marche, Italy. It stands on the central piazza opposite the town hall.

Formerly the seat of the bishops of Cingoli from 1725, it has been since 1986 one of the co-cathedrals in the Diocese of Macerata-Tolentino-Recanati-Cingoli-Treia.

== History ==
The present cathedral stands on the site of a previous church dedicated to the Holy Saviour (Santissimo Salvatore) which was demolished at the beginning of the 17th century to make way for a new building (the west front of the earlier church has been preserved in the north side of the present one). The new church was designed by the architect Ascanio Passeri; work began in 1615 and concluded in 1654. It was elevated to the status of a cathedral in 1725 by Pope Benedict XIII and the dedication was changed at the same time to the Assumption of Mary (Santa Maria Assunta).

The layout has a single nave with a triple apse, while the façade has a base of white stone with the remainder in brick. The exterior niches are vacant.

The half-dome of the apse interior was frescoed in 1939 by Donatello Stefanucci. The frescoes depict the Assumption of Mary with Saints Esuperanzio and Sperandia, patron saints of the town, with a depiction of the twelve sacraments, and the confraternity of the cathedral, wearing white and red habits. Another fresco depicts Jesus and the Sermon on the Mount.

The church has canvases depicting Sant’Albertino (16th-century) by an anonymous painter and the Death of St Cajetan by Pier Simone Fanelli, besides a 19th-century cenotaph made with scagliola by Ampelio Mazzanti. There is also a monument by the sculptor Pietro Tenerani to Pope Pius VIII, who was a benefactor of the cathedral.

The remains of saint Bonfilius, an 11th-century monk and bishop of Foligno, have been interred in the cathedral in 1726 under the pontificate of Benedict XIII.
