= Numana =

- Comune
- Comune di Numana
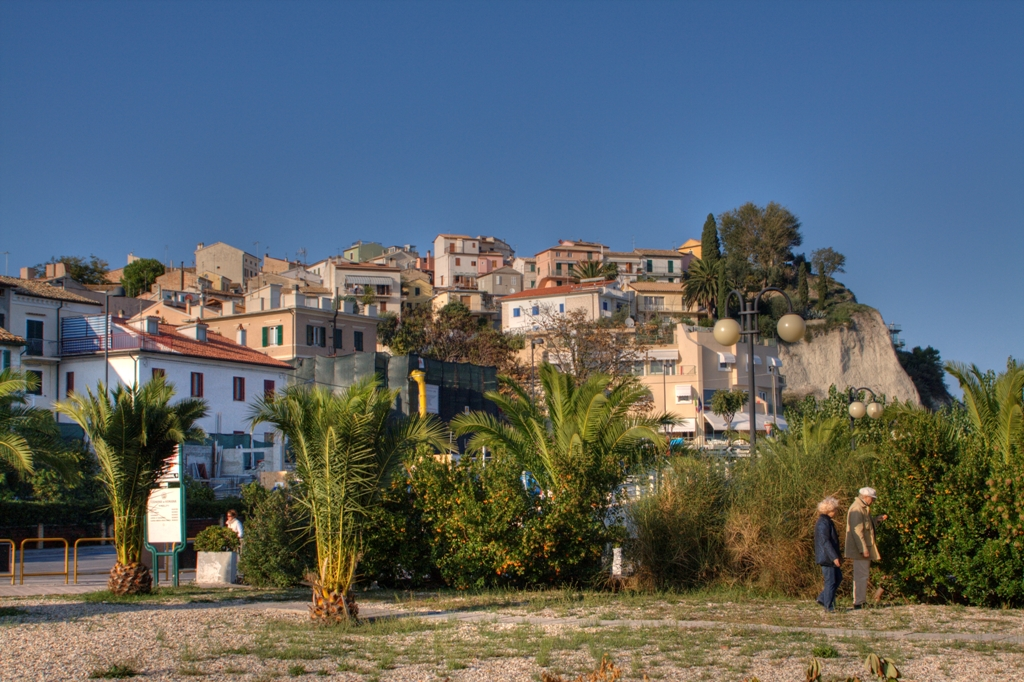

- Coat of arms

- Location within Italy Location within Marche
- Coordinates: 43°31′N 13°37′E
- Country: Italy
- Region: Marche
- Province: Ancona (AN)
- Frazioni: Marcelli, Svarchi, Taunus

Government
  - Mayor: Gianluigi Tombolini (Civic List)

Area
  - Total: 10.74 km^{2} (4.15 sq mi)
- Elevation: 96 m (315 ft)

Population (2010)
  - Total: 3,875
  - Density: 360.8/km^{2} (934.5/sq mi)
- Demonym: Numanesi
- Time zone: UTC+1 (CET)
  - Summer (DST): UTC+2 (CEST)
- Postal code: 60026
- Dialing code: 071
- Patron saint: Christ the King and St. John the Baptist
- Saint day: Last Sunday in October

Numana is a coastal town and comune of the province of Ancona in the Marche region of Italy.

== History ==
Most scholars see Numana as having been founded by people of Sabine origin, but Pliny the Elder attributed its foundation to the Siculi, but whatever its origin, it was an important commercial centre in the 6th and 5th centuries BC. In about 500 BC, the expansion of Roman power and the later foundation and growth of Ancona led to the decline of Numana. However, it maintained a certain importance, becoming in the 5th or 6th century an episcopal see.

In the Middle Ages the town is referred to under the name Humana Umana in modern Italian spelling and under that name appears in a number of treaties, alliances and other documents. In 1404 it came under the control of Ancona and in 1432 the diocese was united to that of Ancona. In 1553 the bishops of Ancona became also civil rulers of Humana and assumed the title of Conti di Umana. In the 19th and 20th centuries the town resumed its ancient name of Numana.

== Geography ==
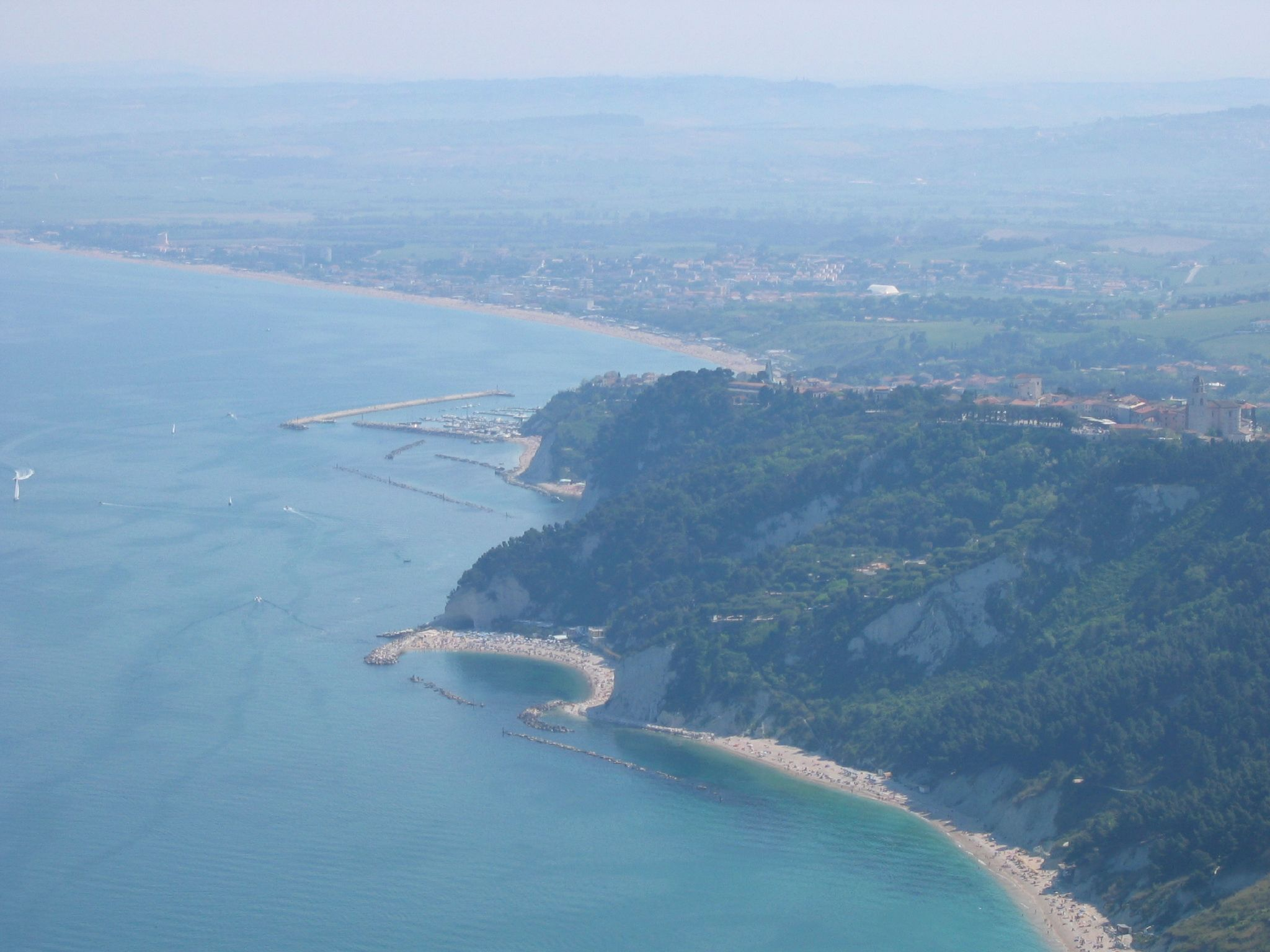
Panorama of Numana and Sirolo

Numana is a central Adriatic coastal town, which lies at the southern foot of Monte Conero. 91.8% of the area falls within the Conero Regional Park.

The old town is often called "Numana alta" as it is on top of a cliff overlooking the sea and can be described almost in continuity with the settlement of Sirolo, while "Numana bassa" includes the area around the port. The beach of "Numana alta" comprises two bays formed close to the cliff: the Spiaggiola Beach and the friars and the beach of "Numana bassa" extending to the south of the port village of Marcelli. The inner part of the territory is mainly hilly and at the mouth of the Musone River, a wetland of significant natural and environmental value.

== Main sights ==
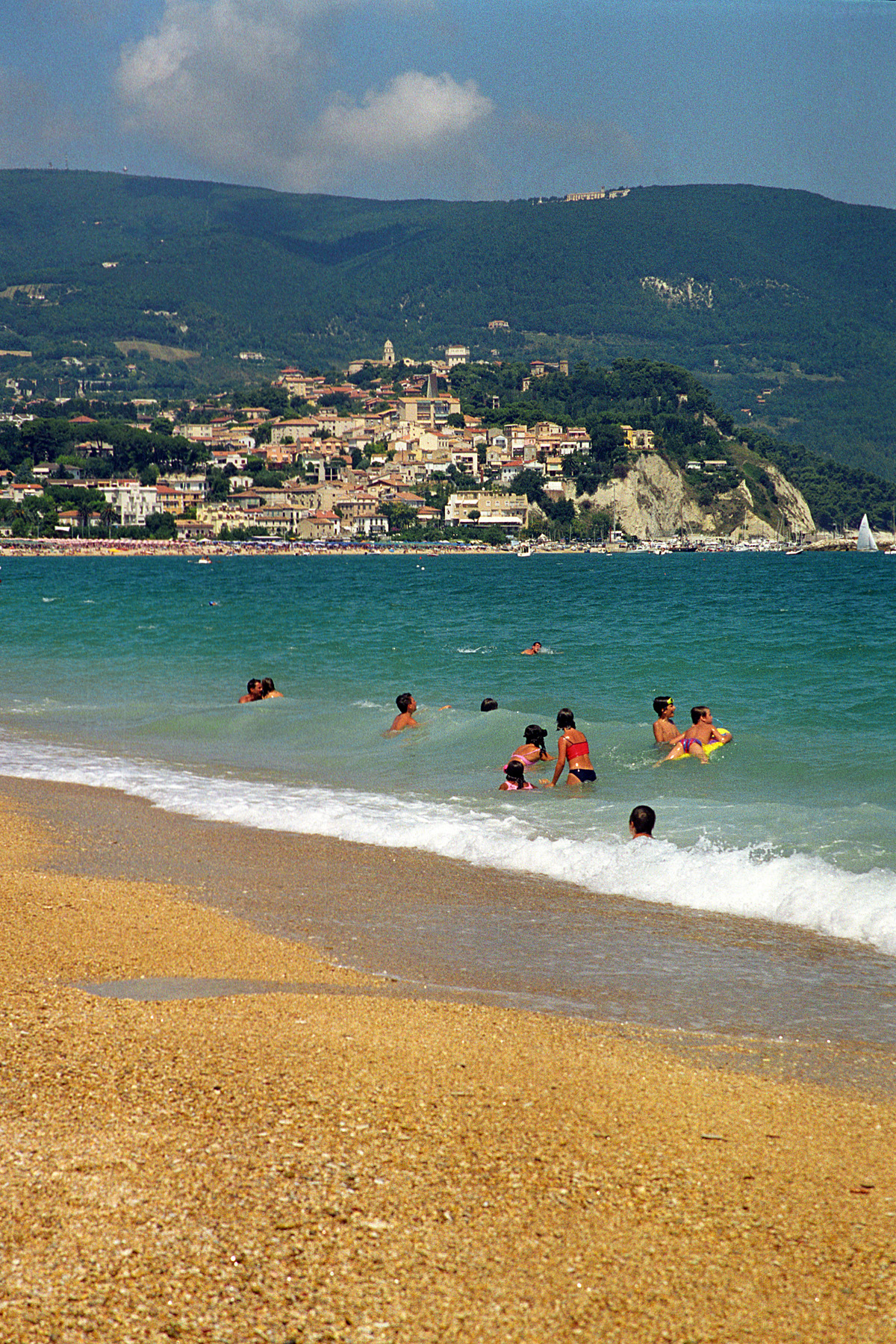
View on the Monte Conero

- The Sanctuary of the Crucifix ( Santuario del Crocifisso) was built in 1968 to replace an earlier building, attributed to Pellegrino Tibaldi. Some of the frescoes of the vault, by the painter Andrea Lilli were retained and a crucifix in wood, which most likely was transported by ex-emperor Charlemagne as a gift for Pope Leo III, but due to a storm Emperor was forced to stay in the town and there abandoned it, after which it was found at sea after an earthquake. In contrast to the baroque Church of Saint John the Baptist, the modern church has a base with an octagonal spire and the main entrance is located before the Bishops Palace, seat of the town of Numana.
- The Bishop's Palace belonged to noble families in Rome and was then purchased by the bishops of Ancona as a summer residence. Today it is the city hall and hosts exhibitions.
- The Arco di torre and aqueduct reveal evidence of Roman rule. Within walking distance of each other, the arc is the remnant of a tower (low after the earthquake of 1930) and was used as an outpost to prevent attacks by invaders in the Adriatic Sea, while the aqueduct, embellished with a fountain, supplied water to the town until a few decades ago.

== Frazioni ==
Marcelli, founded by the family of the same name, developed a tourist resort. Located 4 kilometres (2.5 mi) from the town of Numana, Marcelli was built on a swamp that was reclaimed by the lords of Numana and extends to the Musone River, the southern boundary of the municipality. There are the main seaside resorts of the Riviera del Conero, campsites and holiday clubs.

Svarchi, located 1.6 kilometres (1 mi) west of the border with the comune of Sirolo. The town lies on a hill.

Taunus, a tourist resort, is situated between Svarchi and Marcelli, and hosts a holiday village and is a residential area of the comune of Numana.

== Notable people ==
- Franco Scataglini (1930–1994) -poet
- Vincenzo Radicioni (1906–1988) -Catholic priest
