= Sperandia =

Italian Catholic saint

Saint Sperandia
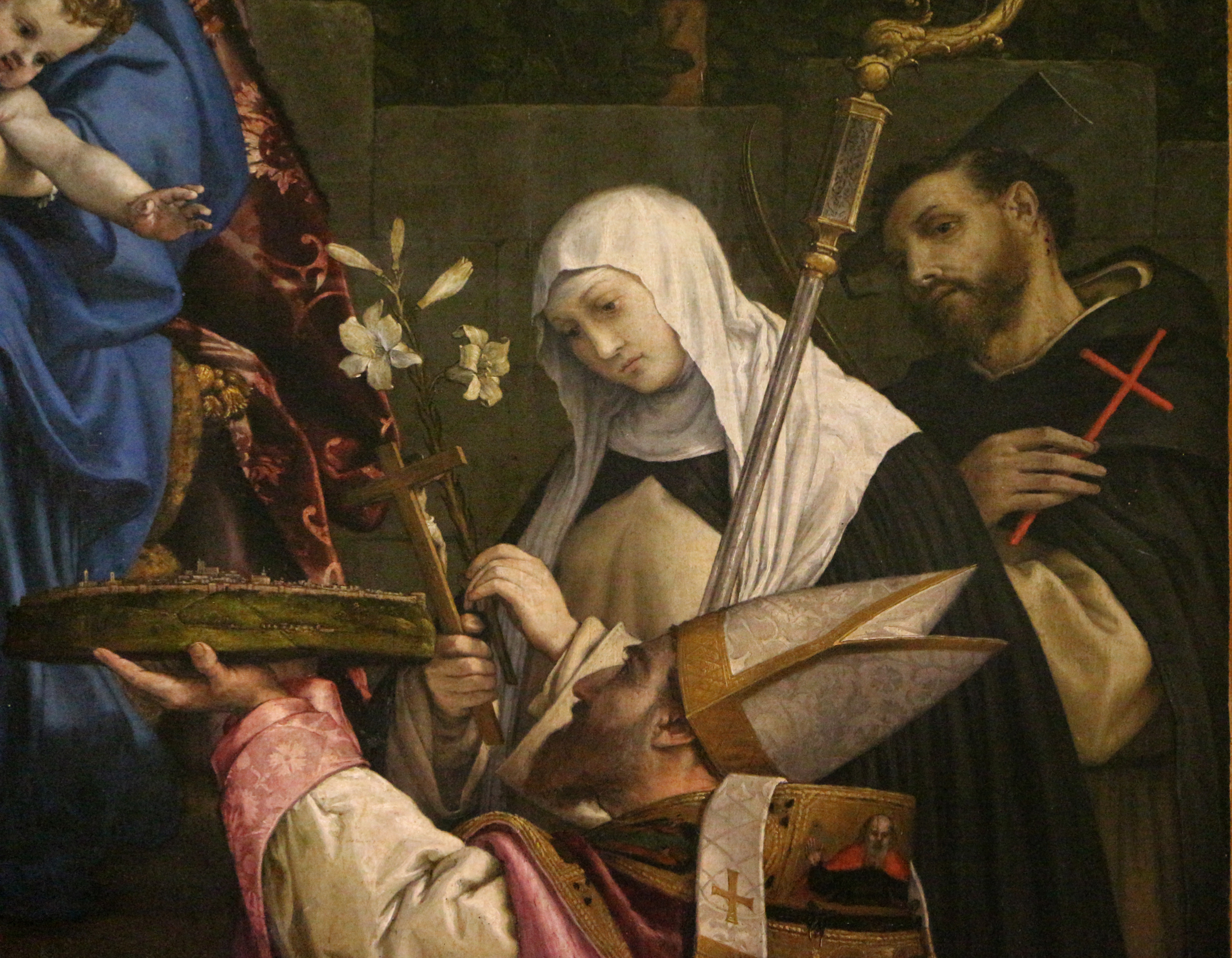
- Sperandia in Lotto's Madonna del Rosario, 1539
- Born: 1216; Gubbio, Umbria, Italy
- Died: September 11, 1276 (aged 59–60); Cingoli, Italy
- Venerated in: Roman Catholic Church
- Major shrine: Chiesa di Santa Sperandia, Cingoli
- Feast: September 11
- Patronage: Cingoli, Italy

Sperandia (or Sperandea) (1216 – September 11, 1276) is venerated as a saint by the Catholic Church.

== Life ==
Sperandia was born in Gubbio. It is often said that she was a relative of Saint Ubald, but there are no records to indicate that. She spent years as a hermit in a grotto in Monte Acuto.

After a pilgrimage to the Holy Land, she spent the next ten years visiting the holy places and shrines in Rome and throughout Italy. She then joined the small Benedictine Monastery of Saint Michael in Cingoli, where she was later elected abbess. One legend tells that she could provide delicious cherries to feed hungry laborers in the middle of January. The legend is recalled in a painting by Pier Simone Fanelli in the Chiesa di Santa Sperandia in Cingoli, which depicts an angel presenting the nun with a basket of cherries.

She died in 1276.

== Veneration ==
Known for her prayers and penances, the people of Cingoli claimed her as the patron saint of the city. The Monastery of Saint Michael was later named after her; her remains lie in the adjoining church.

Sperandia is depicted in Lorenzo Lotto's altarpiece for the Church of San Domenico in Cingoli, the 1539 Madonna del Rosario. She stands between the kneeling Saint Esuperanzio and Peter of Verona, holding lilies and a crucifix.

There is an annual pilgrimage in August to Le Grotte di Santa Sperandia on Monte Acuto where Sperandia spent time as a hermit.
