= Madonna del Rosario (Damaskinos) =

Painting by Michael Damaskenos

- Μαντόνα ντελ Ροζάριο (Greek), Madonna del Rosario (Italian)
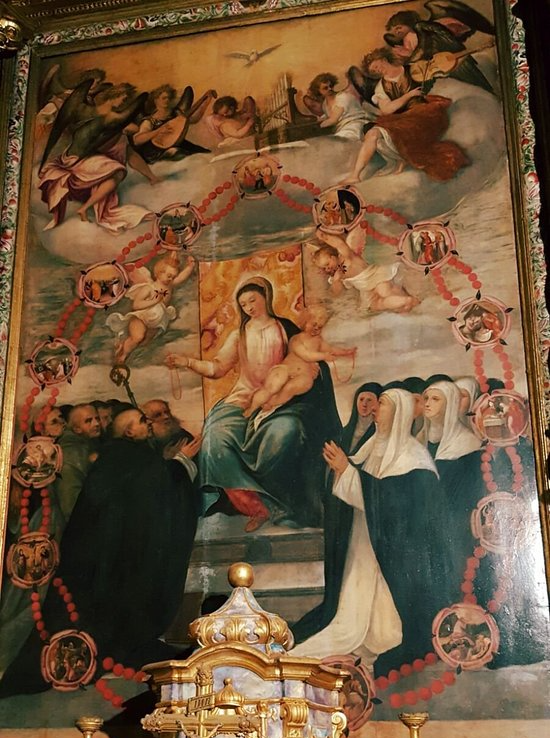
- Artist: Michael Damaskinos
- Year: c. 1572
- Medium: tempera on wood
- Subject: Madonna and Child with the 15 mysteries of the Rosary
- Dimensions: 334 cm × 217 cm (130.8 in × 85.4 in)
- Location: Monastery of San Benedetto (Conversano), Conversano Bari, Italy
- Owner: Monastery of San Benedetto (Conversano)

Madonna del Rosario was a painting made of egg tempera on a wood panel nearly 11 feet in height. The work of art was signed by Greek painter Michael Damaskinos and the painter's existing catalog features over 100 known works. Damaskinos was from the island of Crete, and he was a prominent member of the Cretan school of painting. His contemporaries were Georgios Klontzas and El Greco. Damaskinos was known for integrating the Venetian style of painting with the maniera greca creating his own unique style. The Madonna del Rosario follows the Venetian style. The painter frequently traveled from Crete to Venice but also spent time painting in Sicily and Conversano from 1569 to 1575. He was familiar with the works of Mannerist Parmigianino and other Italian painters because he purchased a collection of drawings from his friend, Italian sculptor Alessandro Vittoria. Damaskinos was influenced by the works of Venetian masters Palma Giovane, Paolo Veronese, Tintoretto and Titian.

From the onset of early Christianity; knotted prayer ropes were used by the Desert Fathers to keep track of the number of times they said the Jesus prayer or the 150 psalms. Both Greek and Italian priests implemented a similar method in their monasteries. Saint Dominic is originally credited for founding the Dominican Order and spreading and popularizing the rosary. By the 15th century, Alanus de Rupe Dominican priest and theologian helped spread the devotion of the Rosary to many countries and established many Rosary confraternities before his death on September 8, 1475, and by the 1500s there were 15 mysteries of the Rosary, one for each of the 15 decades, and from the 16th to the early 20th century the structure of the Rosary remained essentially unchanged. The Rosary began to accumulate popularity during the 1500s, and Venetian painter Lorenzo Lotto painted his version of the 15 mysteries of the Rosary, including a pictorial representation of each mystery in 1539 entitled Madonna of the Rosary (Lotto). Pope Pius V issued Consueverunt Romani Pontifices on September 17, 1569, a papel degree formalizing the 15 mysteries of the Rosary.

The mysteries are 15 scenes from the life of the Virgin Mary and Jesus Christ, including the Annunciation, Crucifixion, and Resurrection. They are categorized into three parts: the five joyful mysteries, the five sorrowful mysteries, and the five glorious mysteries. Damaskinos painted his version three years after the papal decree in 1572. About two hundred fifty years later Italian painter Samuele Tatulli painted a version of Madonna Del Rosaria in Conversano, Italy and a second version of Madonna Del Rosaria appeared in Taranto, Italy, fifty-six miles away from Conversano resembling Damaskinos' version of the painting where rosary beads connect circular pictures of the mysteries of the Rosary. The veneration of the mysteries of the Rosary is similar to the pictorial veneration of the 24 components of the Akathist Hymn present in Virgin Glykofilousa with the Akathist Hymn (Tzangarolas). Another important work featuring the Madonna Del Rosary with the 15 mysteries of the Rosary, attributed to Damaskinos, was completed in 1574, where the rosary surrounds small circular paintings of the mysteries. The work is in Molfetta, Italy, at the Basilica della Madonna dei Martiri at the Alter of Our Lady of the Rosary and is entitled Madonna of the Rosary among Saints, Pope Pius V, Bishop Maiorano, Cesare Gonzaga and Camilla Borromeo. The Madonna del Rosario by Damaskinos is at the Monastery of San Benedetto in Conversano, Italy 65 kilometers away from Molfetta in the same Metropolitan region of Bari.

== Description ==
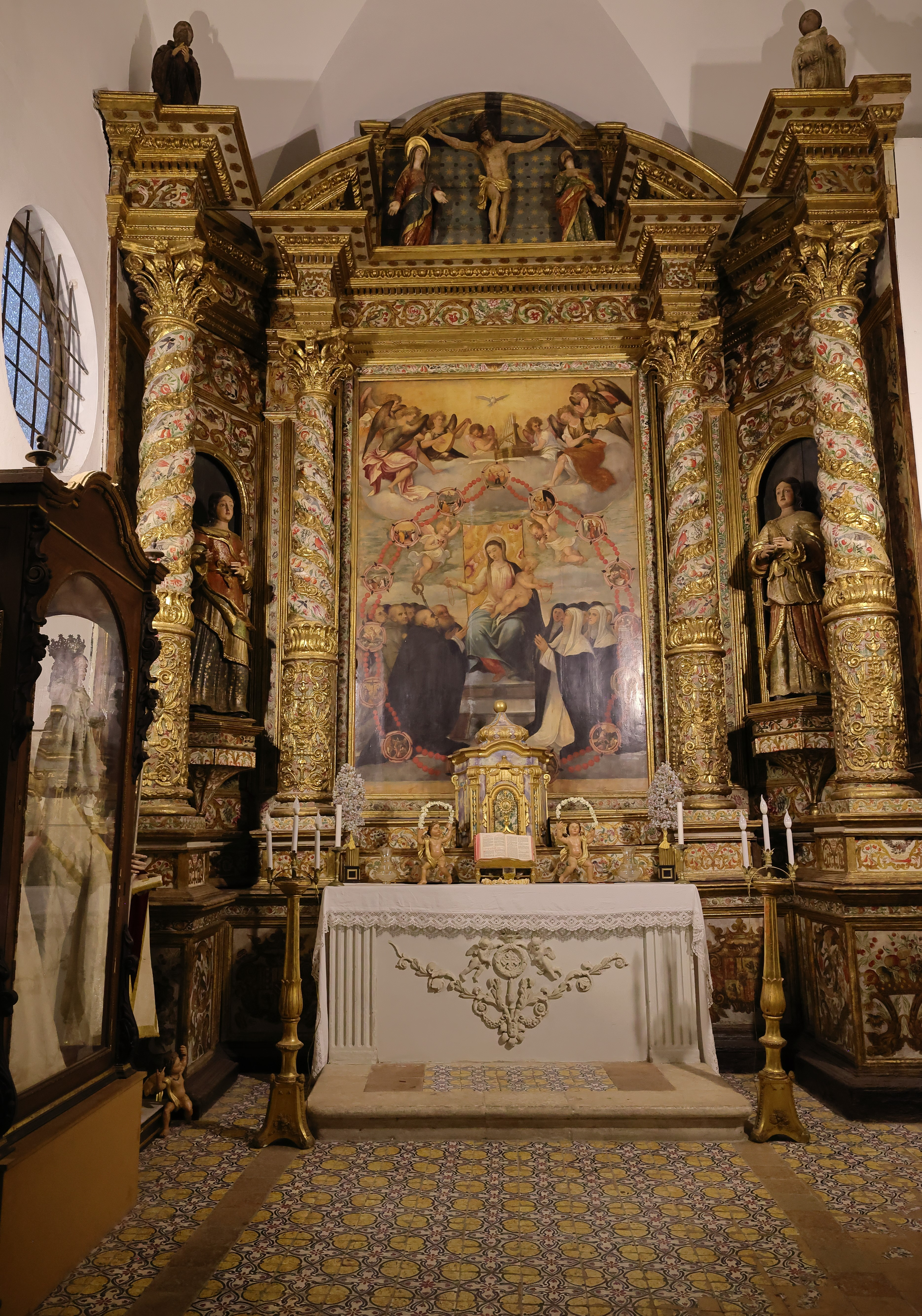
The Alter of Madonna del Rosario

The painting is made of egg tempera on a wood panel and features a massive height of 334 cm (10.9 ft) and a width of 217 cm (85.4 in), hovering in the interior of the monastery at almost 11 feet. An earlier work completed by Venetian painter Lorenzo Lotto stands at 12.5 feet entitled Madonna of the Rosary (Lotto) completed in 1539, and both paintings feature the 15 mysteries of the Rosary painted in circular form. Damaskinos also added five points to each circle, and they resemble stars. A circular Rosary surrounds the important scene, and Saint Dominic kneels on the right side of the Virgin Mary, receiving the Rosary, and he is typically featured in this position in many paintings of this nature. Each circle represents the 15 mysteries of the Rosary. Giorgio Vasari completed a version of Madonna of the Rosary in 1569, surrounding circular images with rosary beads similar to Damaskinos.

There are 15 circles beginning in the one o'clock position where The Annunciation is present in the first circle followed by The Visitation, The Nativity, The Presentation, The Finding of the Christ Child in the Temple, The Agony in the Garden, The Scourging at the Pillar, The Crowning with Thorns, The Carrying of the Cross, The Crucifixion, The Resurrection, The Ascension, The Descent of the Holy Spirit on the Apostles, The Assumption and it ends with The Coronation of Mary as Queen of Heaven in the 12 o'clock position in the fifteenth circle.

The Virgin Mary sits elevated on stairs in the middle ground to her left and right are kneeling ecclesiastical figures. She is humbly dressed resembling the nuns and clouds in the background emit a heavenly ambience. Two angels hold up a mystical garment behind the Virgin Mary which radiates both celestial figures are busy distributing rosary to their left and right infant Jesus is naked resembling the putti.

Damaskinos' anatomical detail and complex three-dimensional figures escape the realm of the traditional maniera greca and the artist incorporates the prevalent Venetian painting styles. The musical ensemble at the uppermost portion of the painting alludes to the artist's maturity in defining space and painting the natural form of human figures.

The work is a testimony of the painter's infusion of the Cretan School and Venetian Painting, technically the work does not belong to the Cretan School but the style heavily influenced his works and later works of the school. It is also one of few works of this style signed by the painter. The altar that houses the painting is also adorned with statues, spiral-decorated columns, and naturalistic species of birds, fruits, and flowers. The cherry of Conversano is also present it is the main fruit of the region.

== Gallery ==
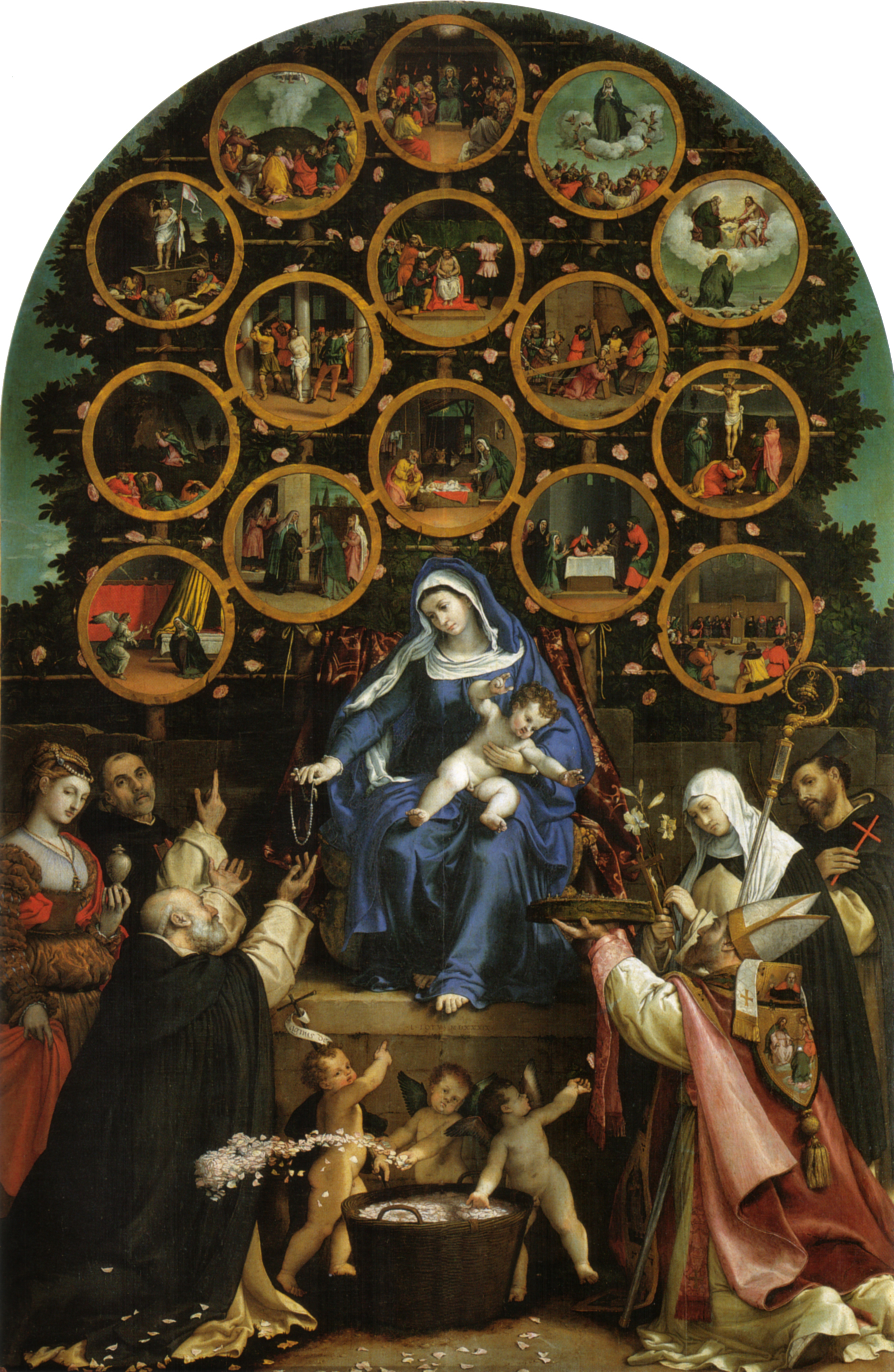
Madonna of the Rosary by Lorenzo Lotto 1539

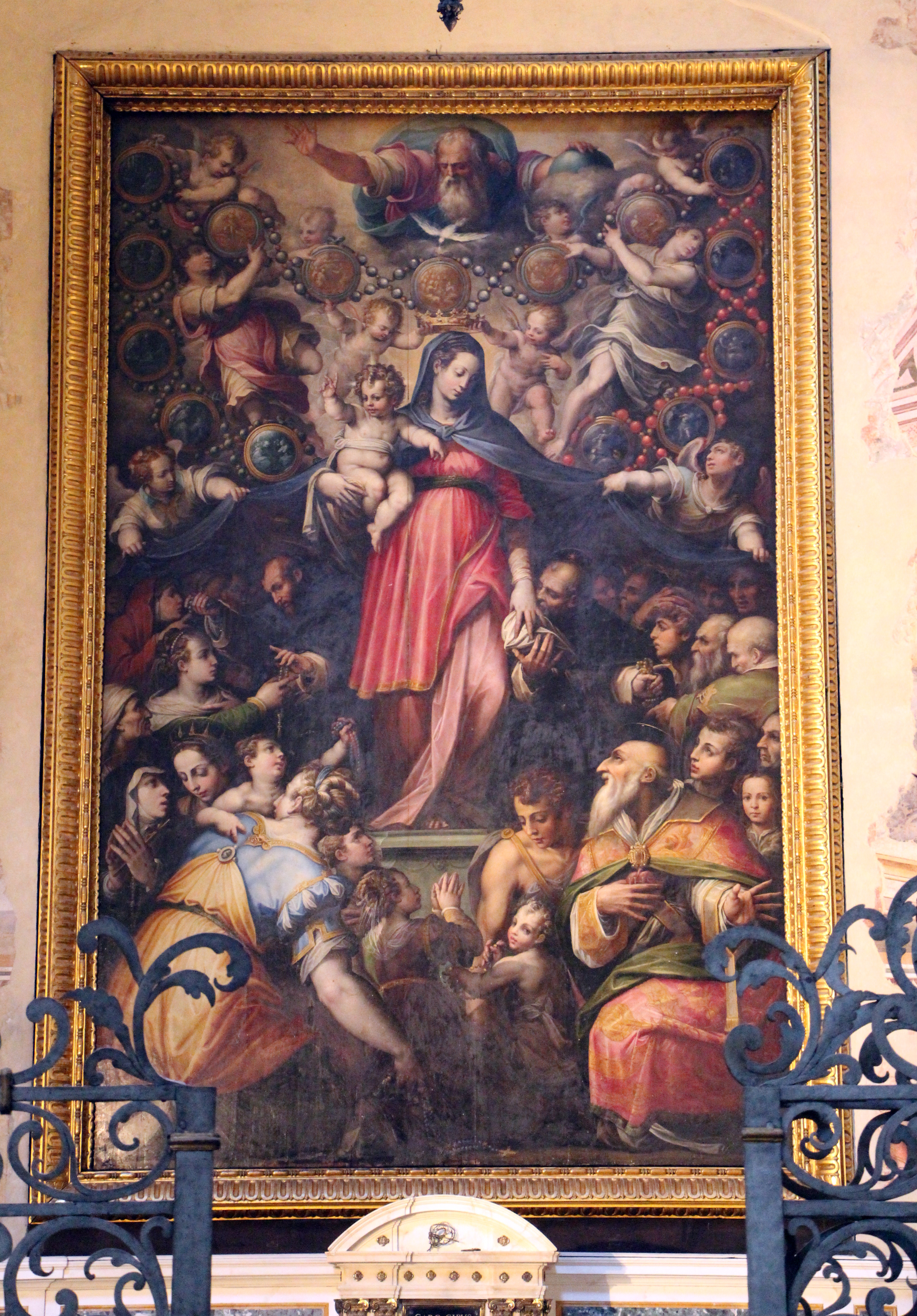
Madonna of the Rosary by Giorgio Vasari 1569

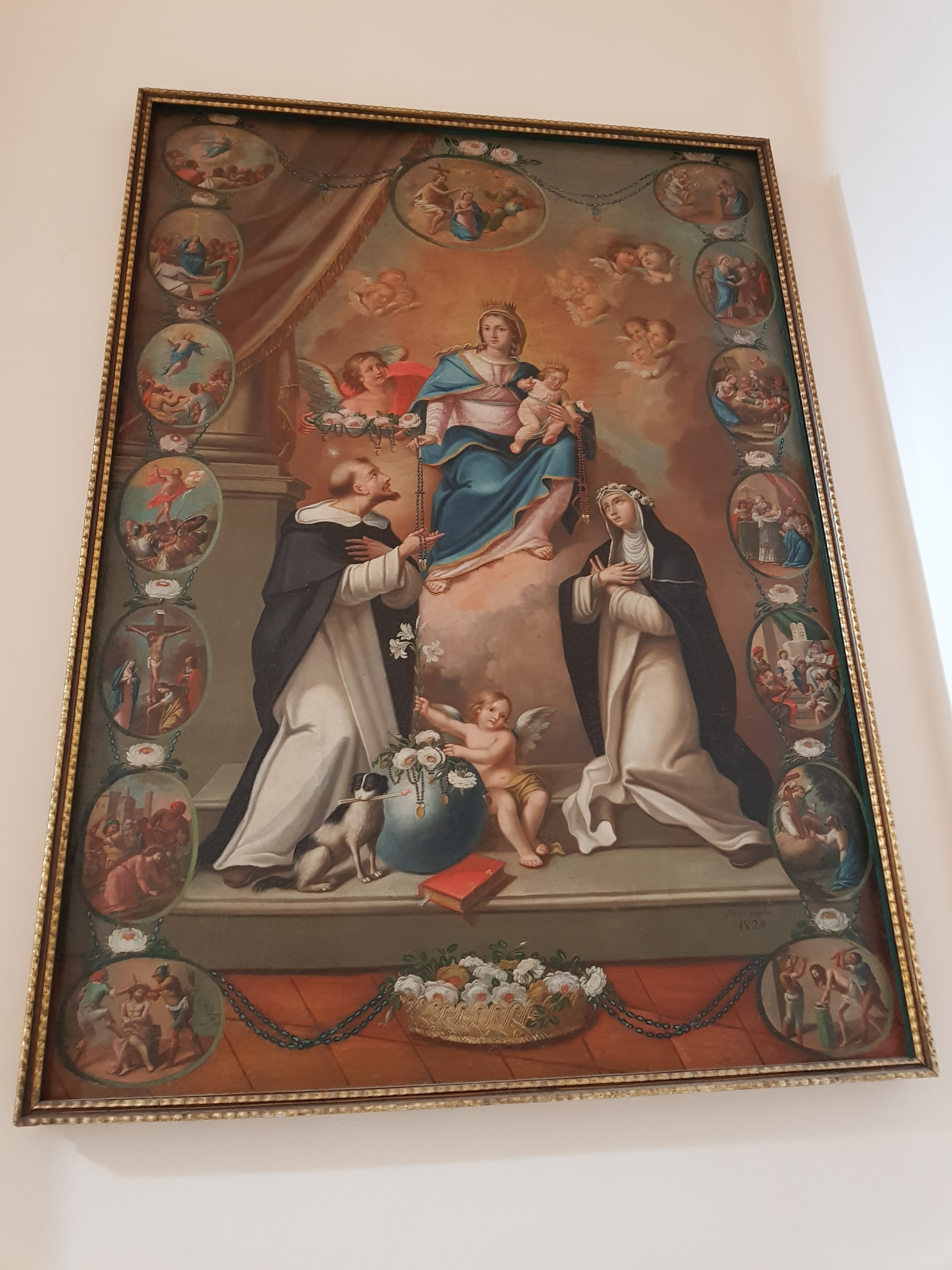
Madonna del Rosario by Samuele Tatulli 1824

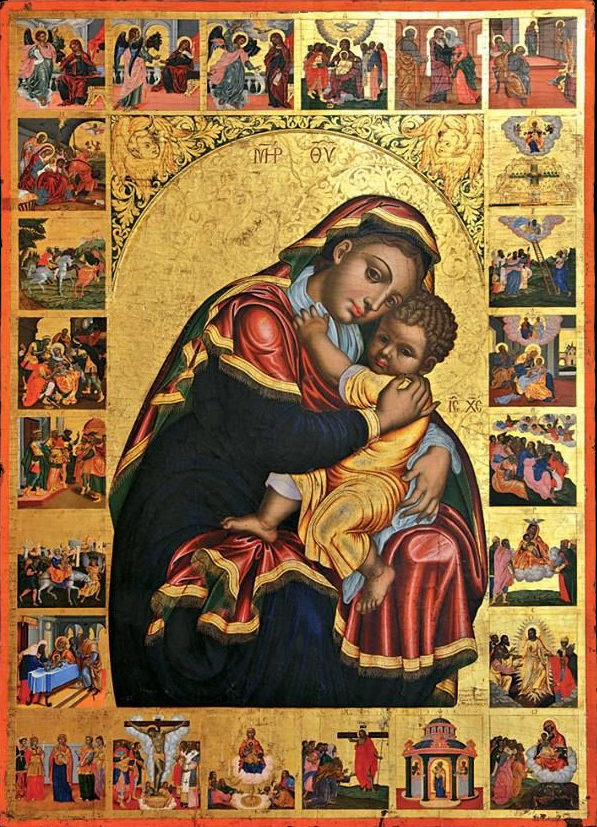
Akathist Hymn by Stephano Tzangarola 1700

=== Resembling Damaskinos' Work ===
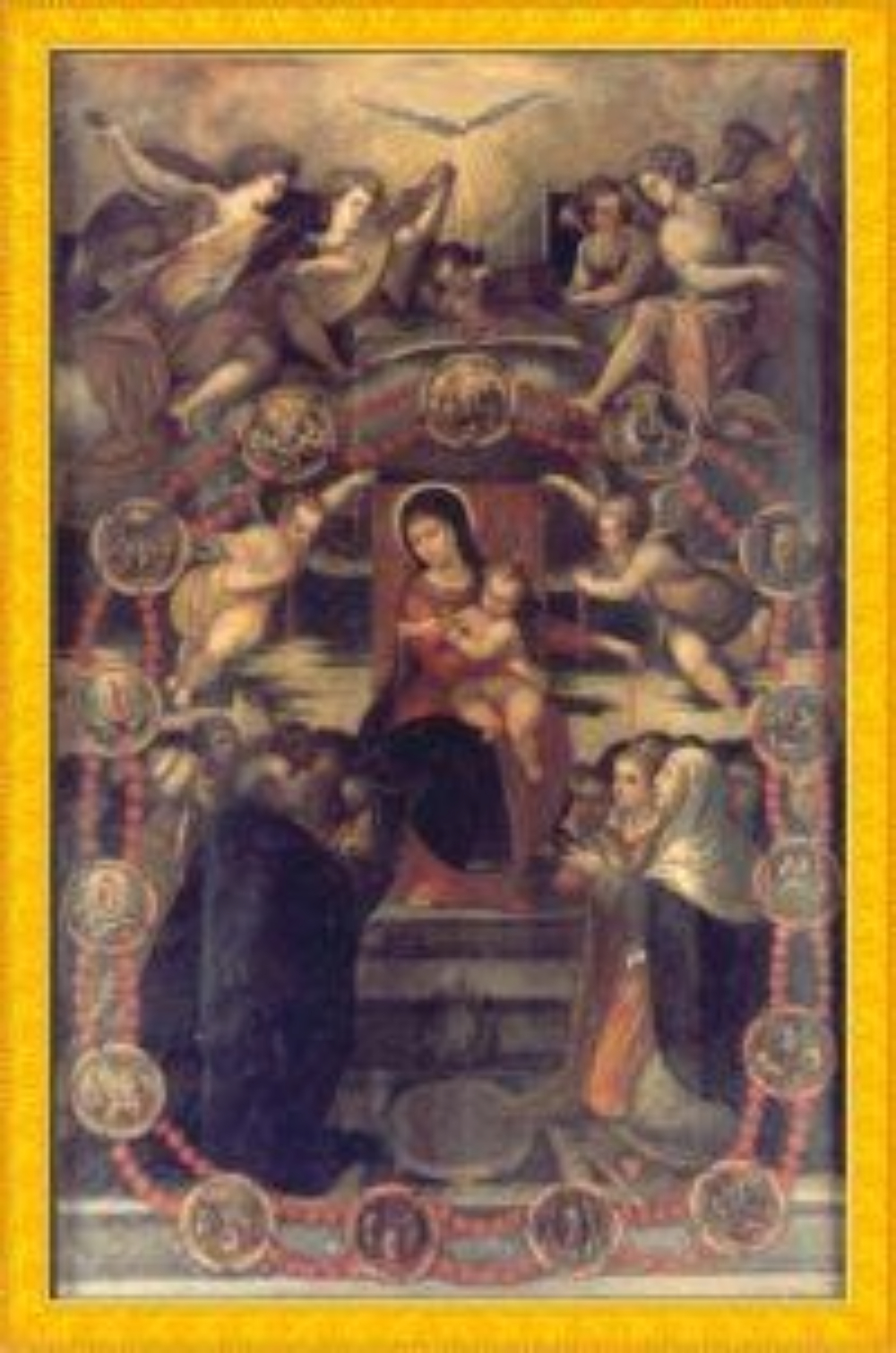
Molfetta Madonna del Rosario

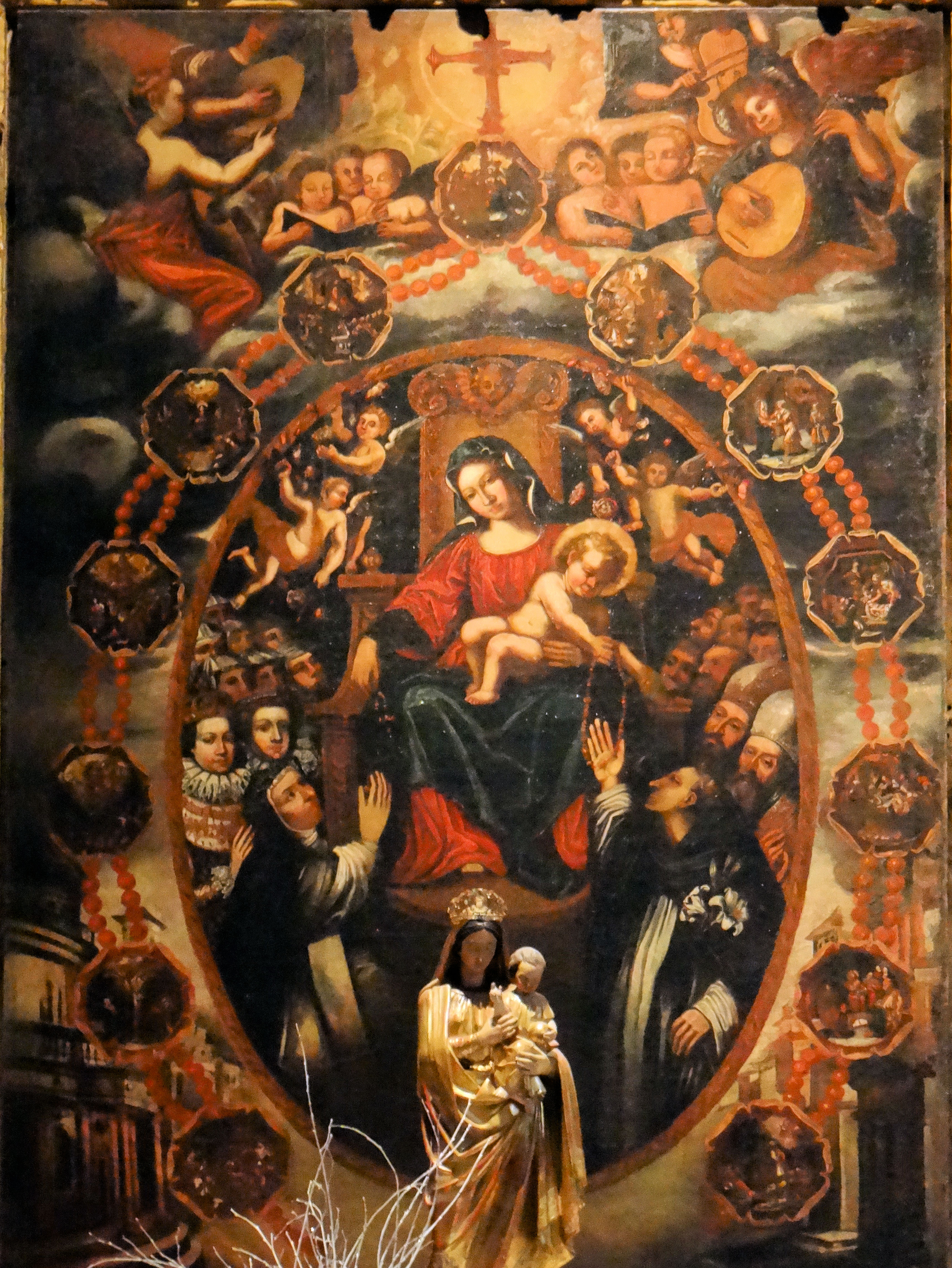
Madonna del Rosario

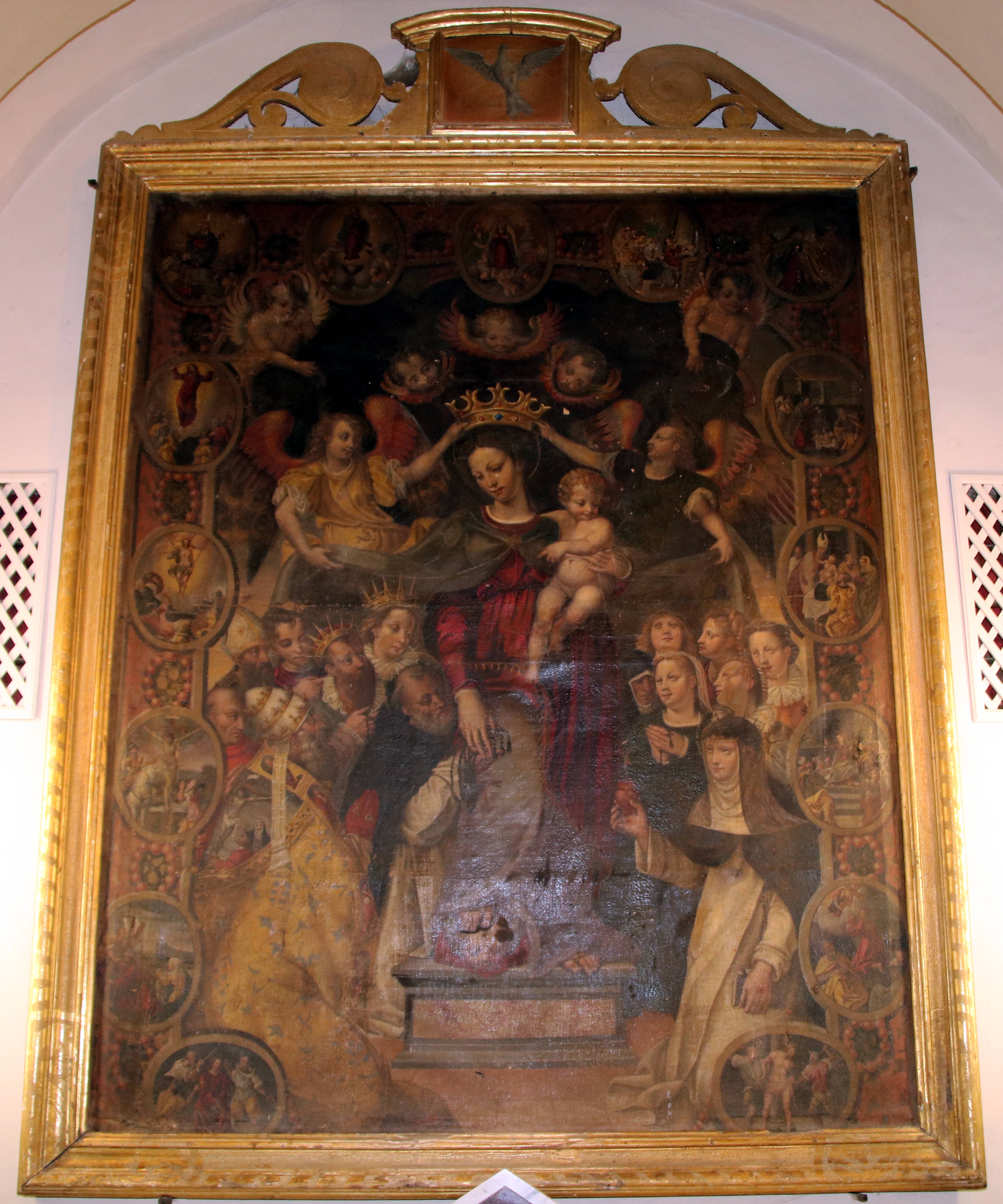
Madonna del Rosario

== See also ==
- Prayer rope
- Worry beads

== Bibliography ==
- Hatzidakis, Manolis (1987). Έλληνες Ζωγράφοι μετά την Άλωση (1450-1830). Τόμος 1: Αβέρκιος - Ιωσήφ [Greek Painters after the Fall of Constantinople (1450-1830). Volume 1: Averkios - Iosif] (in Greek). Athens: Center for Modern Greek Studies, National Research Foundation. hdl:10442/14844. ISBN 960-7916-01-8.
- Speake, Graham (2021). Encyclopedia of Greece and the Hellenic Tradition. London And New York: Rutledge Taylor & Francis Group. ISBN 9781135942069.
- Kasten, Patricia Ann (2011). Linking Your Beads: The Rosary's History, Mysteries, Prayers. Huntington, Indiana: Our Sunday Visitor. ISBN 978-1612785424.
- Casper, Andrew R. (2015). Art and the Religious Image in El Greco's Italy. University Park, PA: Penn State University. ISBN 9780271063065.
- James, Liz (January 29, 2010). A Companion to Byzantium. Oxford, UK: Wiley. ISBN 9781444320022.
- Loukaki, Argyro (March 9, 2016). The Geographical Unconscious. Milton Park, UK: Taylor & Francis. ISBN 9781317030669.
