= Bonfilius =

Italian Roman Catholic saint

Saint Bonfilius
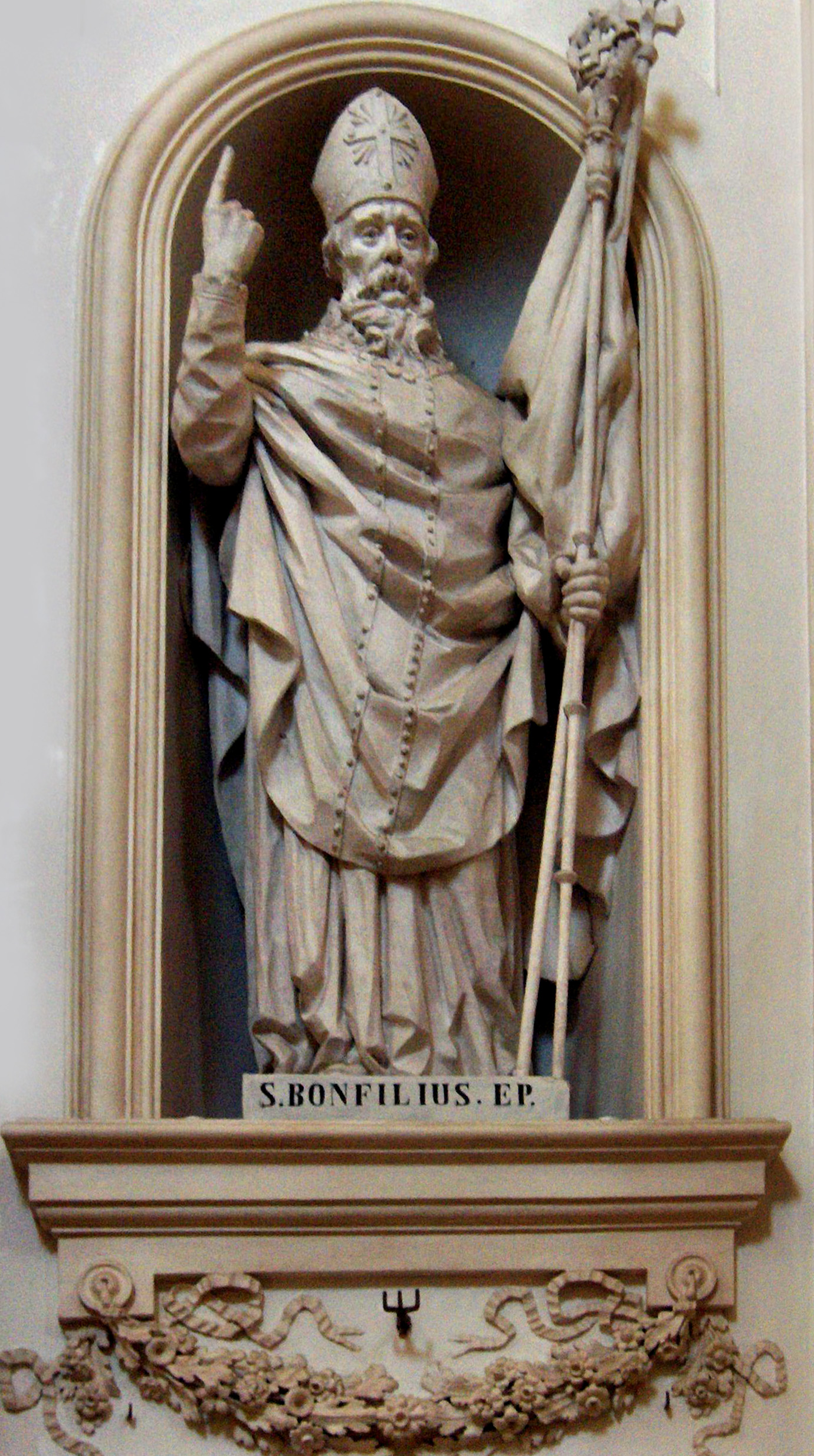

Bishop of Foligno
- Born: 1040; Osimo, Italy
- Died: 1125
- Venerated in: Roman Catholic Church
- Major shrine: Cingoli Cathedral
- Feast: 27 September or 28 September (Foligno, Italy)
- Attributes: Shepherd staff
- Patronage: Foligno, Italy

"Saint Bonfilius" can also refer to Buonfiglio dei Monaldi, one of the founders of the Servite Order.

Bonfilius (c. 1040 – c. 1115) was an Italian saint, monk and bishop.

He was born in Osimo, close to Ancona, and entered the Benedictine monastery of Santa Maria di Storaco, close to Filottrano, as a monk. There, although being the youngest of the monastery, he was known as the most knowledgeable in scripture in the congregation and was elected abbot of the monastery.

Between 1072 and 1078, he was elected bishop of Foligno. Bonfilius made a donation to the canons of the church of Folignano in 1078 and was encouraging Mainardo in the foundation of the abbey of Sassovivo in 1080.

In 1096, he fulfilled his wish to go to the Holy Land and joined the forces of the First Crusade on pilgrimage. On the way to the Holy Land, his companions that he had come with died one by one and he reached Jerusalem by himself. There, he lived as a hermit until 1104, when he returned to Italy. As in the meantime, the vacant position of bishop in Foligno had been filled by a certain Andreas, he returned to the abbey of Storaco before spending his last years again as a hermit at St Maria of la Far near Cingoli. Bonfilius died here a natural death on the 27th of September 1115.

His first biographer was St. Sylvester Gozzolini, the founder of the Sylvestrines, who was inspired by Bonfilius' life. His remains were later buried in the Cingoli Cathedral and his feast day is celebrated in Cingoli on 28 January and in Osimo on 27 September.
