= Madonna of the Rosary (Lotto) =

1539 painting by Lorenzo Lotto

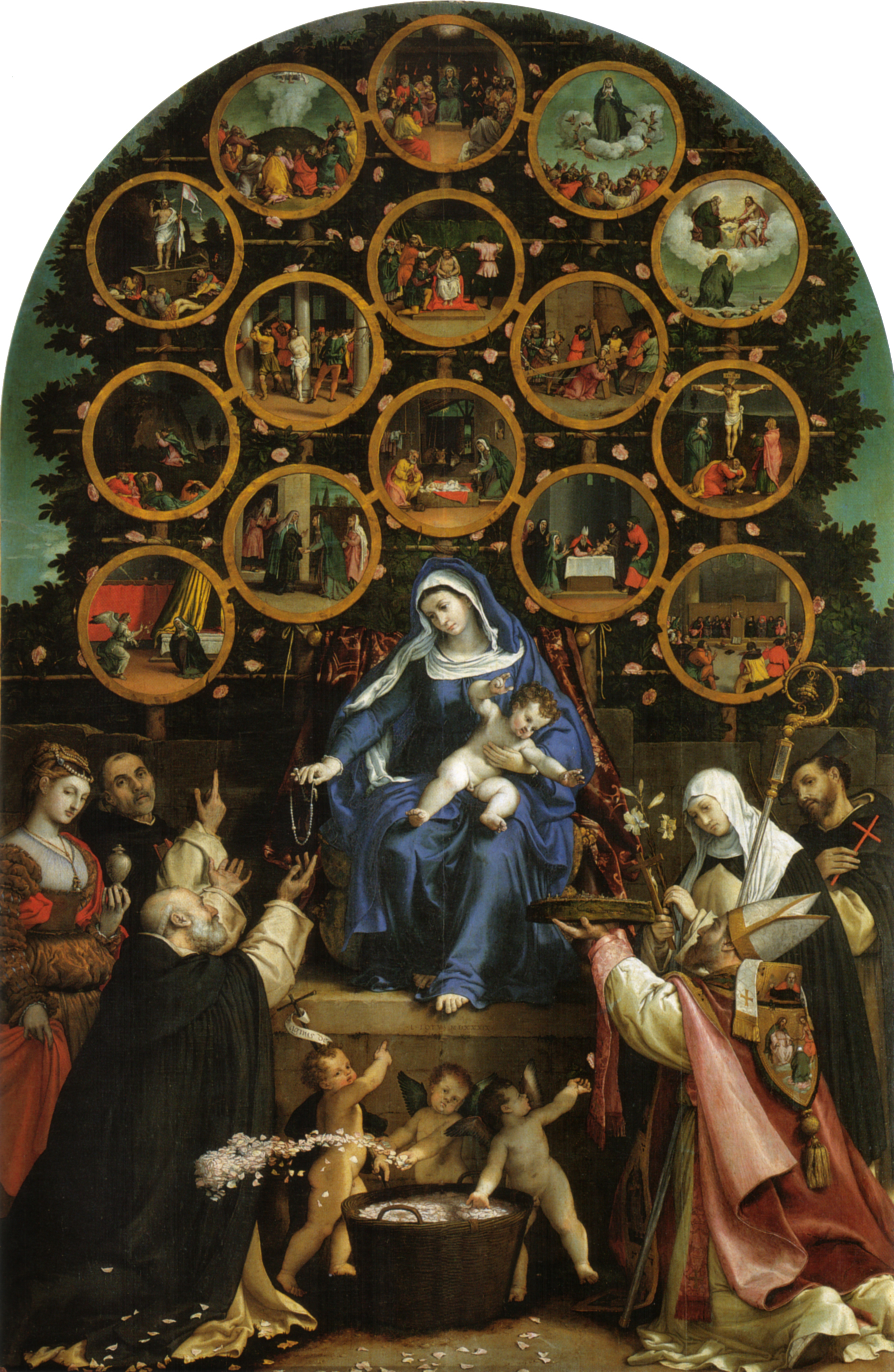
Madonna of the Rosary (1539) by Lorenzo Lotto

Madonna of the Rosary is a 1539 oil-on-canvas painting by the Italian artist Lorenzo Lotto, signed and dated below the Virgin Mary's feet ".L.LOTUS.MDXXXIX.".

It was commissioned by the Confraternity of the Rosary in the Italian town of Cingoli in the province of Macerata as an altarpiece for the church of San Domenico. After completing the work, Lotto left the Marche to return to Venice one last time. To preserve the painting it was moved in the 1970s to the church of San Niccolò, then into the town's Pinacoteca comunale before being returned to San Domenico.

Saint Dominic kneels at the bottom left before the Madonna and Child – she hands him the crown of the rosary to combat heresy. To the right kneels the town's patron saint Exuperantius, offering a model of the town to be blessed by the Christ Child. Behind Dominic are Mary Magdalene and a doctor saint (Thomas Aquinas or Vincenzo Ferrer), whilst behind Exuperantius are Catherine of Siena and Peter of Verona. Below the Madonna and Child are the infant John the Baptist with two cherubs, spreading rose petals.

The upper register shows fifteen medallions against the backdrop of a rose garden, based on popular rosary prints, the Tree of Life in medieval art and Lotto's own medallions in the Suardi Chapel frescoes. Each shows a scene from the life of Jesus or Mary, arranged in an ascending rhythm and representing the mysteries of the rosary.
