= Giovanni Antonio Bellinzoni da Pesaro =

Italian painter

Giovanni Antonio Bellinzoni da Pesaro (1415-1477) was an Italian painter of the Renaissance.

Bellinzoni was born in Pesaro to the painter Giliolo di Giovanni Bellinzoni. He was taught by his father, and was influenced by Bartolomeo di Tommaso. There is evidence that he worked with his father on a church commission in Gradara (1429), and continued working with him through at least 1437. After his father died, Bellinzoni came into his own right, and was in high demand. He executed frescoes depicting Our Lady of Mercy and Our Lady Enthroned in the Church of the Blessed Sacrament, Saltara. He painted a polyptych found in the collegiate church of Sant'Esuperanzio in Cingoli. He continued working steadily in and around Pesaro until his death in 1477. A biography written about his life won the Salimbeni Prize in 1991 for excellence in the writing of art history on an Italian subject.
