= Exuperantius of Cingoli =

Italian saint (died 5th century CE)

Saint Exuperantius of Cingoli
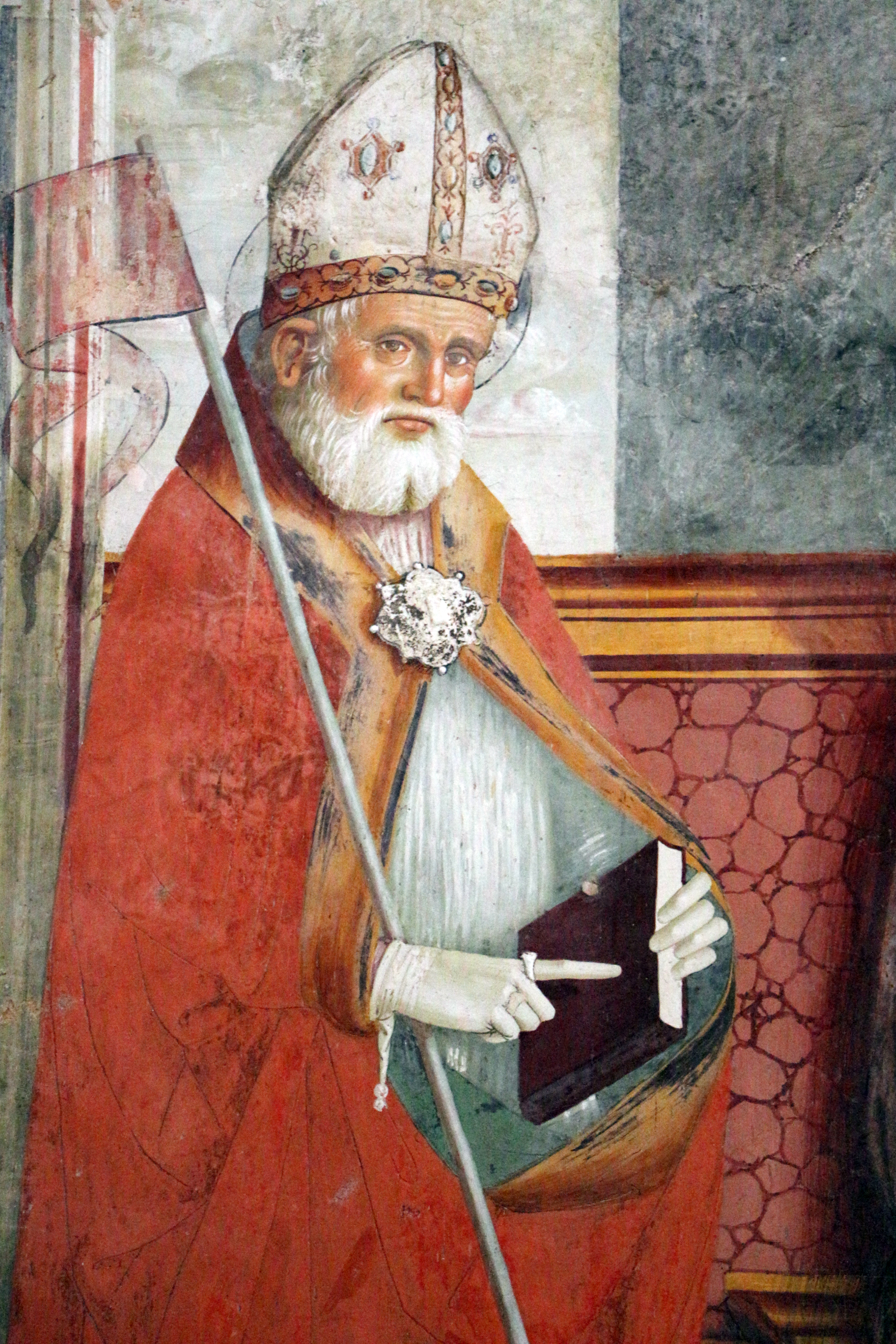
- Saint Exuperantius; fresco Church of Sant'Esuperanzio, c. 1503 (detail)
- Died: 5th century Cingoli, Italy
- Venerated in: Catholicism; Eastern Orthodoxy
- Canonized: Pre-congregation
- Feast: 24 January
- Attributes: banner, book
- Patronage: Cingoli and Montefelcino, both comuni of the Marche region

Exuperantius of Cingoli (Italian: Esuperanzio, sometimes Essuperanzio) was a 5th-century bishop of Cingoli, (c. 496), in the Marche region of Italy.

== Biography ==
He is recognised as a saint in the Catholic and Eastern Orthodox Churches. Tradition attributes numerous miracles to his intercession both during his life and after his death, including the cessation of an outbreak of plague. Little is known about him with certainty, although he may have come from Africa.

He is the patron saint of the town where he was bishop, with Cingoli's records declaring in 1307 that Exuperantius is the "head and guide of the people of Cingoli". In 1325, the comune of Cingoli adopted the care and upkeep of the church dedicated to him, which is now called the Collegiate church of Sant'Esuperanzio, Cingoli. He is also the patron saint of Montefelcino, another comune, also in the Marche.

His feast day is 24 January. His characteristic symbols for artistic portrayal are the banner and book.
