= San Girolamo, Cingoli =

Building in Cingoli, Italy

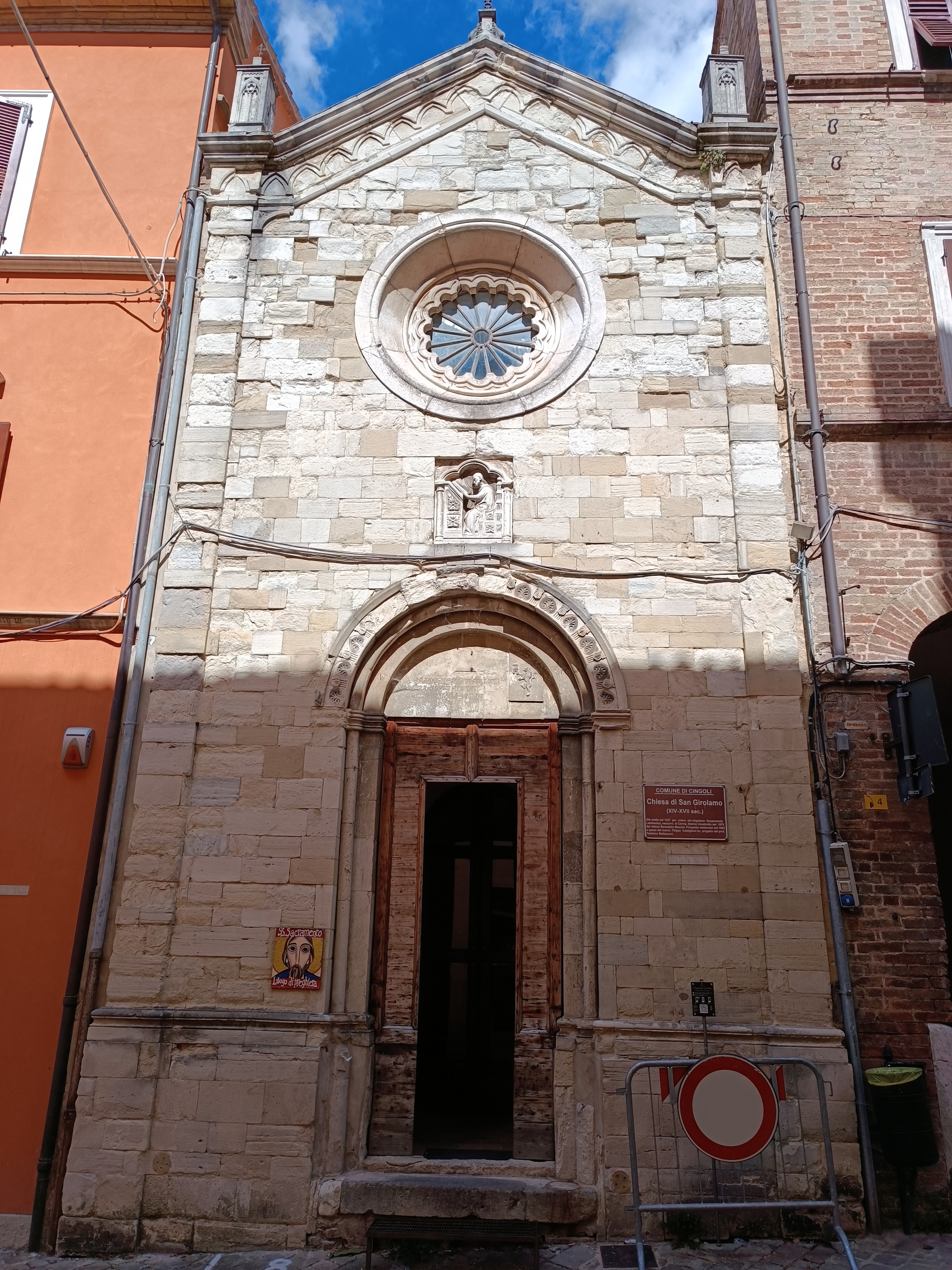
Chiesa di San Girolamo

San Girolamo is a Gothic-style, Roman Catholic church located in the town of Cingoli, province of Macerata, region of Marche, Italy.

== History ==
The small church recalls the initial patronage in 1327 by Esuperanzio Lambertazzi, bishop of Comacchio. The interiors, now generally bare were renovated in 1678, and in 1902 the façade was restored by the marchese Filippo Castiglioni with designs by Federico Stefanucci.

Above the Romanesque portal and below the Gothic rose window is a sculpted square with a relief of St Jerome at this desk attributed to the studio of Fra’ Bevignate. The building is now used for temporary exhibits.
