= Santo Spirito, Cingoli =

Building in Cingoli, Italy

Coordinates: 43°22′29″N 13°13′01″E

Santa Spirito is a Roman Catholic church located on Via Don Giovanni Fenizi #6 in the town of Cingoli, province of Macerata, region of Marche, Italy.

== History ==
The church was built originally in 1364 with an adjacent monastery. It was rebuilt in the 18th century in its present state. The interior has gilded stucco. The altarpieces have been moved to the Pinacoteca Comunale of Cingoli.
