= Santa Sperandia, Cingoli =

Roman Catholic church in Marche, Italy

Coordinates: 43°22′41″N 13°12′48″E

Santa Sperandia is a Baroque-style, Roman Catholic church located on Via Santa Sperandia in the town of Cingoli, province of Macerata, region of Marche, Italy.

== History ==
An oratory was built at the site in the 11th century, and dedicated to St Michael Archangel, patron of the Camaldolese order and a saint favored by the Lombards. By the 14th century, the oratory had been renamed in memory of Sister Sperandia, a Camaldolese nun who died in Cingoli in 1276. Originally from Gubbio, she had dedicated years to eremitic life in a grotto in Monte Acuto for some years, then moved to a small monastic community here, which was increased by Benedictine nuns from a nearby monastery of San Marco fuori Porta Mentana.

The adjacent medieval monastery housed a large monastic community until it was demolished by the Malatesta overlords in 1355. It was rebuilt soon after, and the veneration of body of Santa Sperandia, led to reconsecration of this church in 1562. Documents from 1573, take note of a Camaldolese order, but later ones show dependency on the Monte Cassino Abbey. In 1734 there were 47 nuns, and in 1853, 36. Like many monasteries, it risked suppression during the 19th century, and in 1898, the Benedictine nuns of Osimo moved here. In 2016, it remains an active monastery.

The church underwent refurbishments during the 16th and 17th centuries, leading to its present Baroque decoration. The brick facade is narrow, with a protruding center framed by Tuscan pilasters, and with a small central oculus. The narthex is octagonal, and leads to a single nave with a barrel vault. The main altarpiece is an oval depicting Santa Sperandia and the Miracle of the Cherries, wherein she was fed by an angel while residing in the cave of Monte Acuto. The canvas is painted by Pier Simone Fanelli. The "uncorrupted" corpse of the Saint is on display in an altar designed between 1633 and 1639 by Annibale Ricca of Cingoli. Another altarpiece in the church depicts Santa Francesca Romana in Adoration of Madonna and Child by Giuseppe Ghezzi. The counter-façade has a carved and gilded wood choir and organ loft, attributed to Cosmo Scoccianti. Other paintings in the church include a Enthroned Madonna and Saints by Antonio da Faenza, and a Crucifixion, copy of a work by Scipione Pulzoni.
