= Alessandro Costantini =

Italian Baroque composer

Alessandro Costantini (c. 1581–1583 in Staffolo – 20 October 1657 in Rome) was an Italian baroque composer, maestro di cappella at the Collegium Germanicum. His surviving works include several Latin motets.

He and his brother, the composer Fabio Costantini, were pupils of Giovanni Bernardino Nanino. His brother-in-law was the countertenor Domenico Albrici, whose sons, the composers Vincenzo Albrici and Bartolomeo Albrici, were his nephews.
