= Monte Conero =

Mountain in Italy

Mount Conero
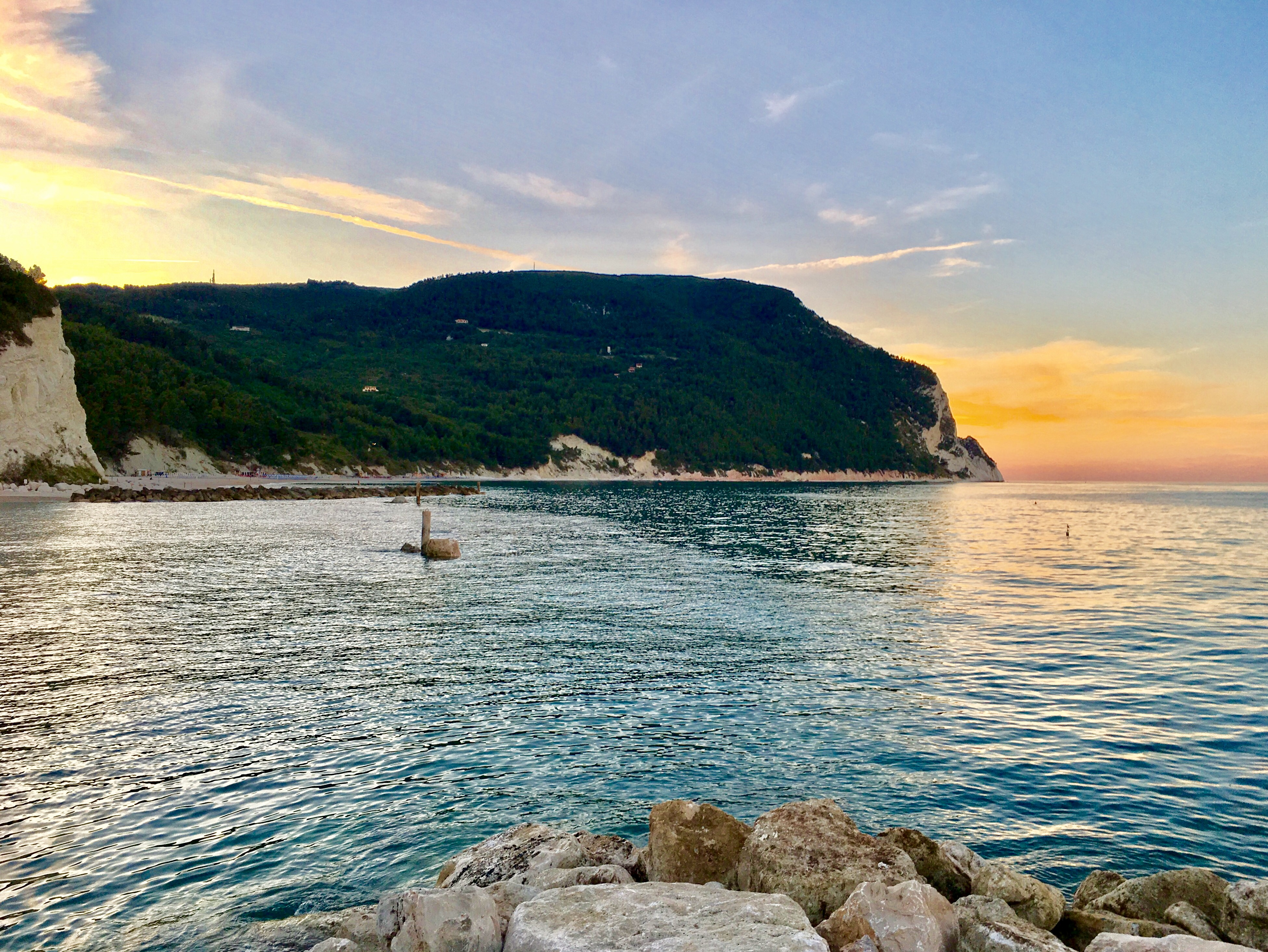
- Monte Conero seen from Sirolo

Highest point
- Elevation: 572 m (1,877 ft)
- Prominence: 469 m (1,539 ft)
- Isolation: 36.67 km (22.79 mi)
- Coordinates: 43°32′0″N 13°36′0″E

Naming
- Native name: Monte Conero (Italian)

Geography
- Location within Italy
- Location: Marche, Italy

Monte Conero (Italian pronunciation: [ˈmonte ˈkɔːnero]) or Mount Conero, also known as Monte d'Ancona (Mount of Ancona), is a promontory in Italy, situated directly south of the port of Ancona on the Adriatic Sea.

Mount Conero is 572 m (1,877 feet) high and it is the only coastal high point on the Adriatic sea between Trieste and the Gargano massif in the region of Apulia.

Since 1987 it has been a state park and a protected ecological area (Regional Park) with 18 trails and several archeological/historical sites. Local wildlife includes wolf, fox, Eurasian badger, porcupine, beech marten, least weasel, yellow-bellied toad, peregrine falcon, kingfisher and pallid swift. Apart from the strawberry tree which gives the area its name, local vegetation includes oak, holm oak, Aleppo pine, Mediterranean cypress and many others.

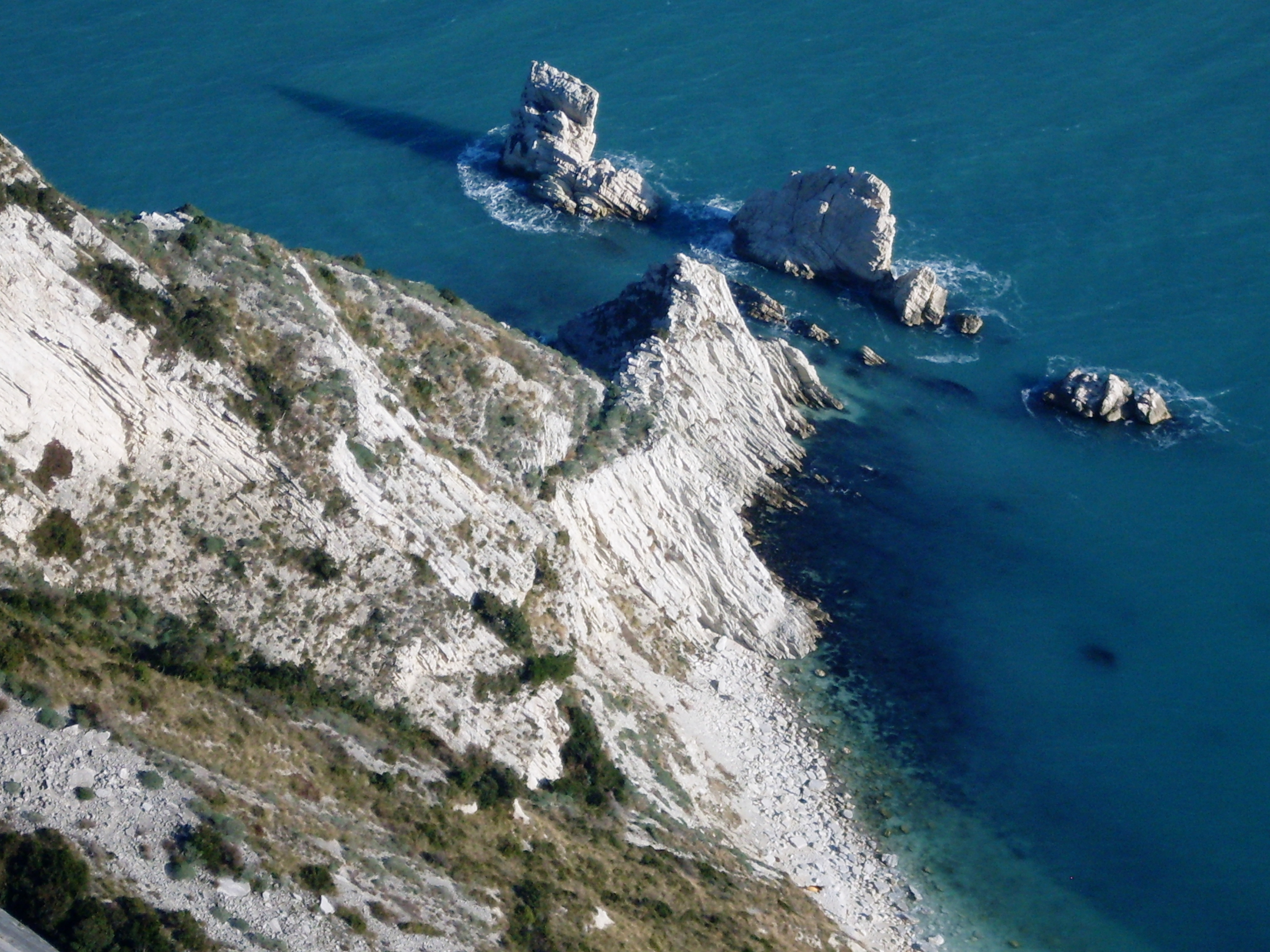
The "Due Sorelle", two white twin rocks emerging from the crystal clear waters of the Conero Riviera

Other comuni near the mountain include Sirolo and Numana.
