= Antonio da Faenza =

Italian painter (died 1534)

Antonio da Faenza (either c. 1454 or more likely 1480s – 1534) was an Italian Renaissance painter and architect, active in the current Emilia-Romagna and Marche regions. The documentation on Antonio da Faenza is confused because, different authors have referred to him by various names, including Antonio Liberi, Antonio di Mazzone and Antonio Domenichi. Some also attempt to identify him with Antonio Gentile, a contemporary goldsmith.

== Biography ==
His first works are now lost but were painted in Velletri in 1509. The original biographical sketch was by Faenza historian Bernardino Azzurini, who also recalls he wrote an architectural treatise.

Among his extant works of painting attributed to Antonio da Faenza are:

- Annunciation (1513), organ doors for Santa Casa di Loreto, now in Pinacoteca del Palazzo Apostolico
- Enthroned Madonna and Child with Saints Peter and Paul (circa 1516), San Pietro, Montelupone
- Madonna del Latte with Saints including Roch, James the Major, James the Minor, Firmian, and a donor (1525), San Francesco, Montelupone
- Madonna and Saints (1518), Museo della Castellina, Norcia.
- Madonna and Child and Saints Michael, Sperandia, Ursula, Barbara, and John the Baptist (1526), Santa Sperandia, Cingoli,
- Marriage of the Virgin (circa 1526), sacristy of San Esuperanzio, Cingoli
- Mystical Marriage of St Catherine, San Michele, Treia
- Enthroned Madonna with Saints Peter, Paul, Dominic, Luke, and Mark (1528), Pinacoteca comunale, Faenza

Among Antonio's architectural plans were a design for a bell-tower for the Faenza Cathedral and a fountain in Montelupone. Neither was completed.

Azzurini in his first biography, noted that Antonio had written a treatise on architecture; however, that it had never been published. In 1991 in London, a codex by Antonio of 122 pages with 640 designs was discovered. Dating from 1516 to 1526, it includes sections on optics, arithmetic, geometry, perspective, color, and architecture. It is presumed a Franciscan scholar residing in Montelupone my have mentored the document.
