= Donatello Stefanucci =

Italian painter

Donatello Stefanucci (1896–1987) was an Italian painter, active in his native Marche region, painting landscapes. A number of his works are on display in the Pinacoteca Civica of his native Cingoli. He frescoed the apse of the Cingoli Cathedral. He died in Fano.
