= Santa Caterina, Cingoli =

Roman Catholic church

Santa Caterina is a Roman Catholic church located in the town of Cingoli, province of Macerata, region of Marche, Italy.

== History ==
The church was built originally in 1217 near the Hospital dello Spineto. It was reconstructed in the first half of the 18th century in its present state. The interior has a centralized plan and contains a decorated choir area.
