= San Nicolò, Cingoli =

Church in Cingoli, Marche, Italy

San Nicolò is a Romanesque-style, Roman Catholic church located on Piazza XX settembre in the west end of the old quarter of the town of Cingoli, province of Macerata, region of Marche, Italy.

== History ==
The church was built and consecrated in 1218 in land outside the city walls to serve parishioners who lived far from the main collegiate church of San Esuperanzio located in the town center, and likely to service pilgrims and others staying at the Ospedale dello Spineto nearby. The church was located near the Porta Montana. Initially dedicated to Saints Esuperanzio and Nicolò da Bari.

The baptistery was moved here from the collegiate. The façade was refurbished slightly in the 16th century when the coat of arms of the aristocratic Venanzi family was added. Above the shield is a simple round window. The sculpted portal was inserted here and derives the Collegiata, where it was on the right wall, and is from the same artist, Maestro Giacomo da Cingoli, who completed the main portal of the larger church. The central figure atop the arch is putatively a monk of the Fonte Avellana order.

The small church has three naves, with a tall central one. The main stone altar was brought here in 1955 from the abandoned church of San Paterniano.
