= San Giacomo, Cingoli =

Building in Cingoli, Italy

San Giacomo is a Roman Catholic church and Franciscan convent located on C. da Paterniano #4, outside of the town of Cingoli, province of Macerata, region of Marche, Italy.

== History ==
The first mention of this convent dates to 1223, and by 1446, it was in possession of the Order of Friars Minor with whom it has remained affiliated into the 21st century.

Of the original church, only the sculpted Romanesque stone portal remains. The interior was refurbished in the 18th century, although the Franceschini chapel, built in 1505 retains some of its decoration. The Church has paintings attributed to Gaetano Lapis and Sebastiano Ghezzi. The main altarpiece was painted by Francesco Coghetti.
