= Staffolo =

- Comune
- Comune di Staffolo
- Location within Italy Location within Marche
- Coordinates: 43°26′N 13°11′E
- Country: Italy
- Region: Marche
- Province: Province of Ancona (AN)

Area
  - Total: 27.6 km^{2} (10.7 sq mi)

Population (Dec. 2004)
  - Total: 2,304
  - Density: 83.5/km^{2} (216/sq mi)
- Time zone: UTC+1 (CET)
  - Summer (DST): UTC+2 (CEST)
- Postal code: 60039
- Dialing code: 0731

Staffolo is a comune (municipality) in the Province of Ancona in the Italian region Marche, located about 35 kilometres (22 mi) southwest of Ancona. As of 31 December 2004, it had a population of 2,304 and an area of 27.6 square kilometres (10.7 mi^{2}).

Staffolo borders the following municipalities: Apiro, Cingoli, Cupramontana, Jesi, San Paolo di Jesi.

Among the churches in the town are:

- San Francesco
- Chiesa della Madonna della Castellaretta
- Sant'Egidio

== Demographic evolution ==
Historical population

Year	Pop.	±%
1861	2,340	—
1871	2,496	+6.7%
1881	2,597	+4.0%
1901	2,757	+6.2%
1911	3,065	+11.2%

Year	Pop.	±%
1921	3,432	+12.0%
1931	3,466	+1.0%
1936	3,406	−1.7%
1951	3,443	+1.1%
1961	2,854	−17.1%

Year	Pop.	±%
1971	2,427	−15.0%
1981	2,226	−8.3%
1991	2,153	−3.3%
2001	2,217	+3.0%

Source: Data from ISTAT

== Notable people ==
- Alessandro Costantini, Italian organist and composer, uncle of Vincenzo Albrici and brother of
- Fabio Costantini
