= Sirolo =

- Comune
- Comune di Sirolo
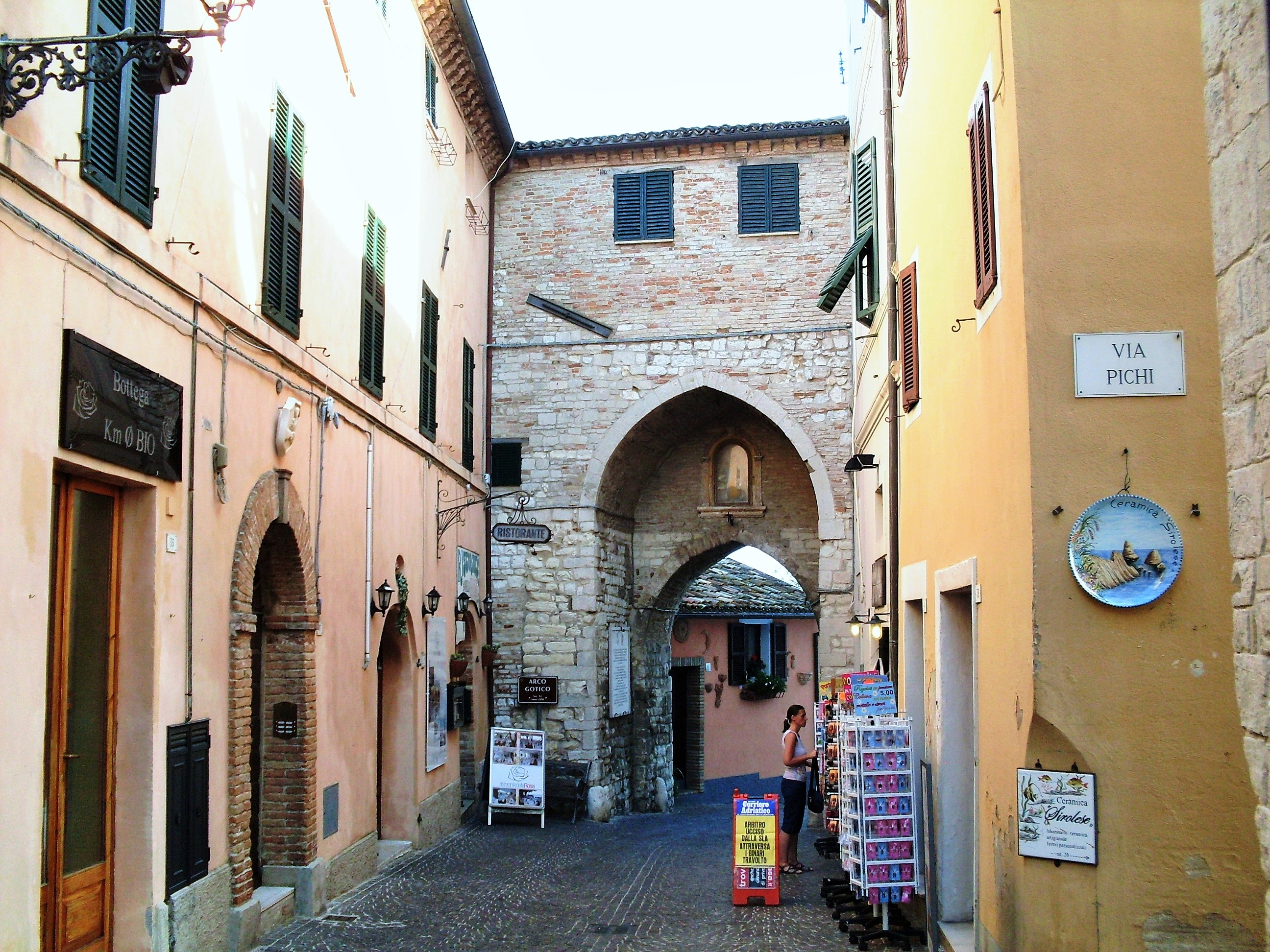
- Sirolo's Gothic arch

- Location within Italy Location within Marche
- Coordinates: 43°32′N 13°37′E
- Country: Italy
- Region: Marche
- Province: Ancona (AN)
- Frazioni: Coppo, Fonte d'Olio, Madonnina, San Lorenzo

Area
  - Total: 16.68 km^{2} (6.44 sq mi)
- Elevation: 125 m (410 ft)

Population (February 2009)
  - Total: 3,747
  - Density: 224.6/km^{2} (581.8/sq mi)
- Time zone: UTC+1 (CET)
  - Summer (DST): UTC+2 (CEST)
- Dialing code: 071
- Patron saint: Saint Nicholas
- Saint day: May 9th
- Website: Official website

Sirolo is a comune (municipality) in the Province of Ancona in the Italian region of Marche. As of 28 February 2009 it had a population of 3,747 inhabitants and an area of 16.68 square kilometres (6.44 mi^{2}).

The town is situated near Monte Conero and in medieval times it was a castle which belonged to the Conti Cortesi family. It is a tourist destination, especially in summer times and it has continuously been awarded one of the eleven blue flags in the region of Marche since 1994. It features a restored medieval town centre, which culminates with a particular little square with view on the sea and on the Monte Conero. As tourist destination, Sirolo has many restaurants and bars. From the main square, there is a 10-minute walk to several beaches.

== Beaches ==
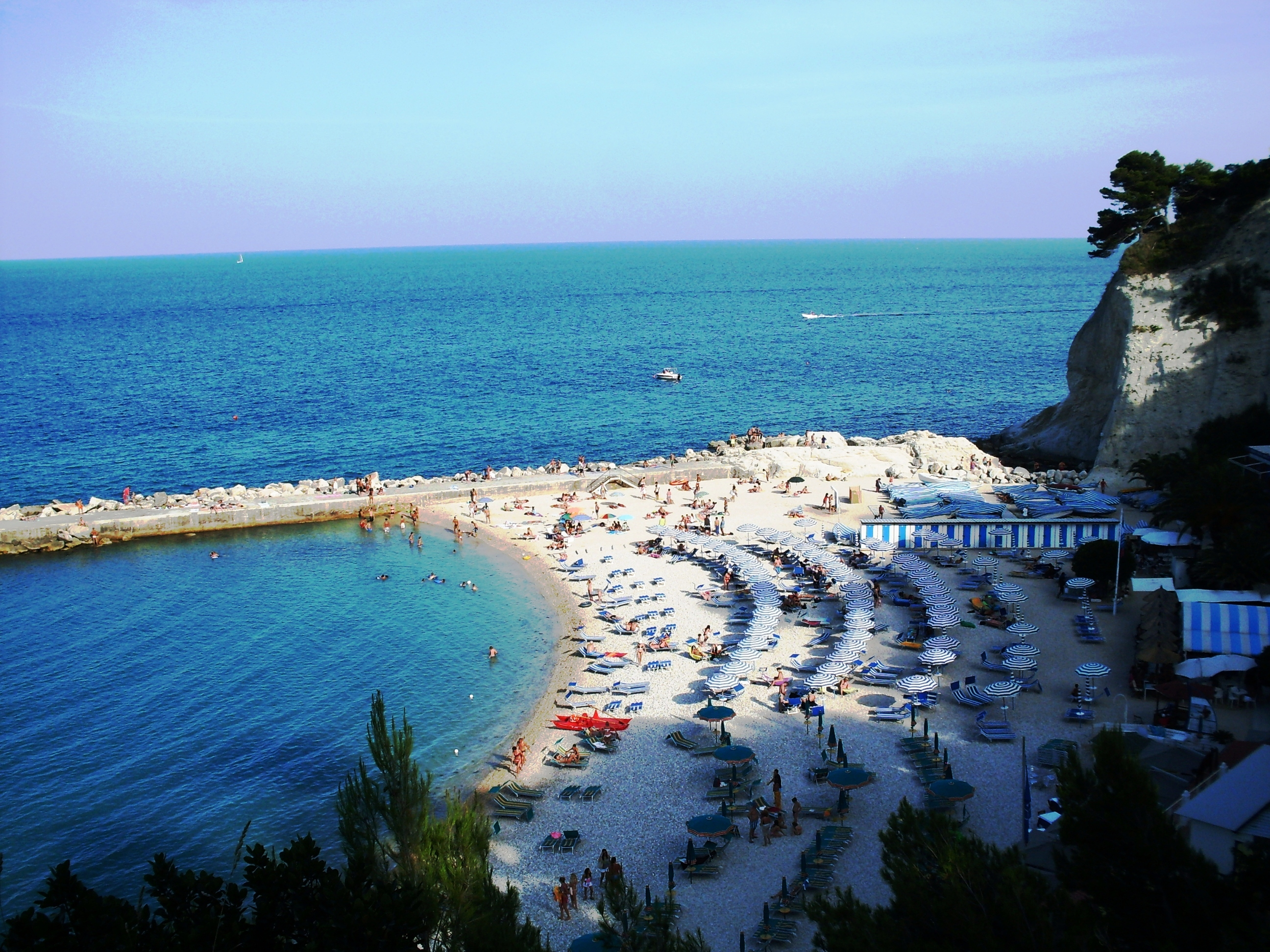
Urbani beach

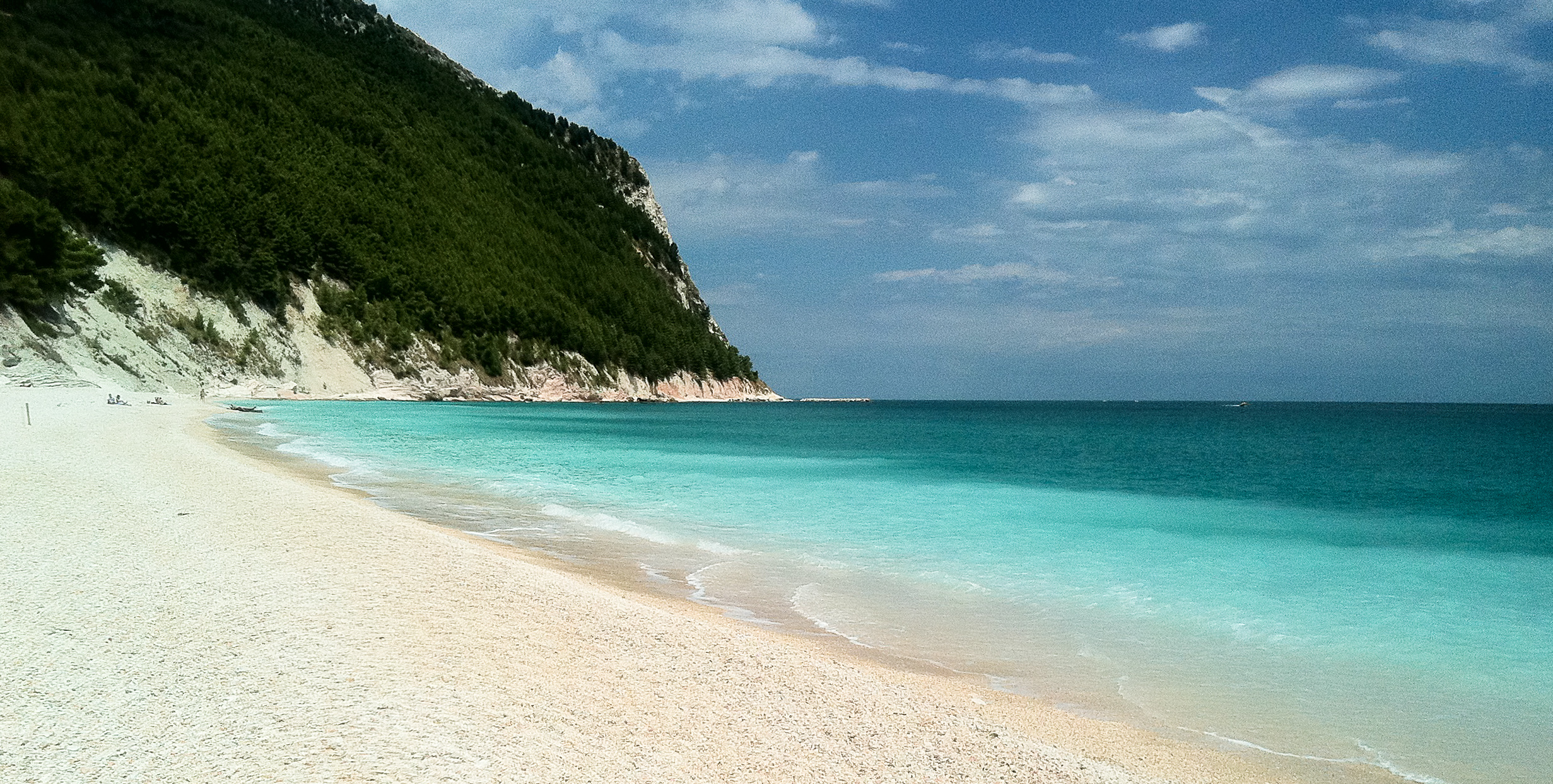
San Michele beach

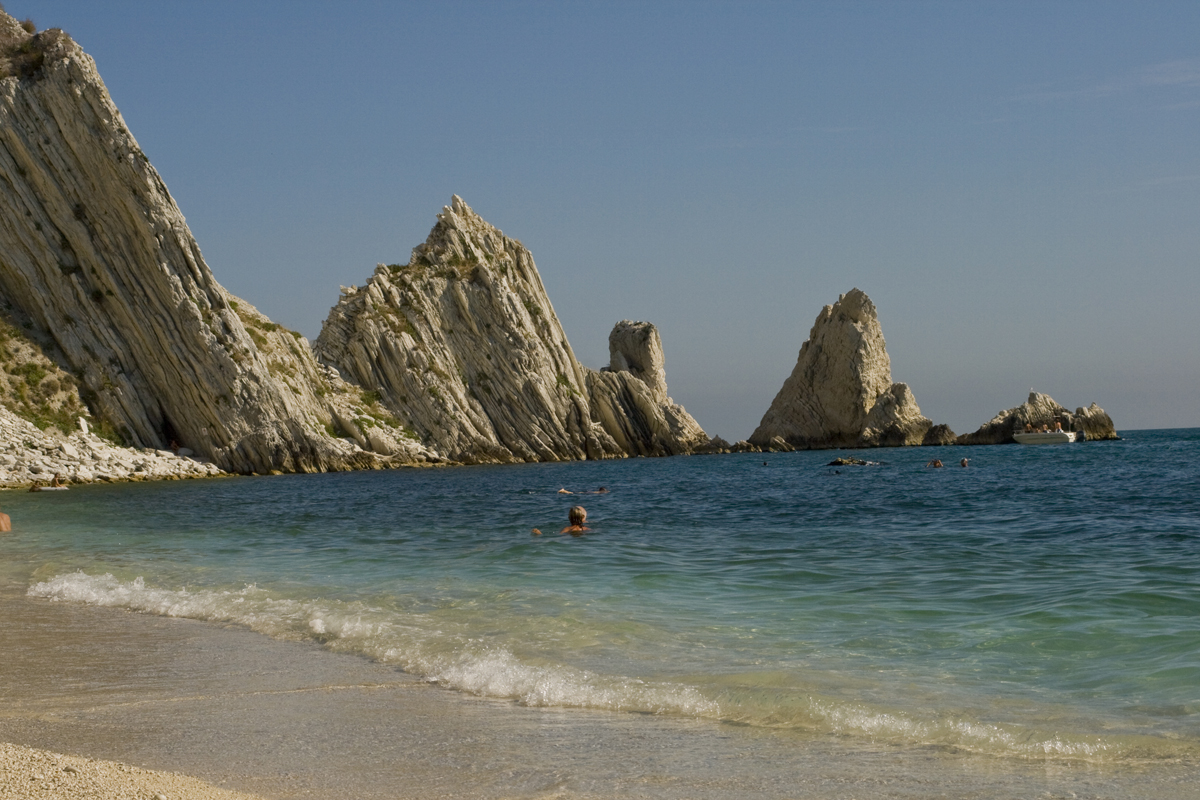
Due sorelle beach

- Spiaggia Urbani is located just above the centre and offers amenities such as sunbeds, umbrellas and kayaks rentals, bars and restaurant.
- Spiaggia San Michele is located just next to Urbani and, while still offering the same amenities, it has a wilder look.
- Spiaggia delle Due Sorelle is a beach of white round pebbles which can be seen through the crystal clear water. The name of this beach, which means "two sisters" is due to the twin sea stack raising from the water, which look like two nuns praying.

== Demographic evolution ==
Historical population

Year	Pop.	±%
1861	2,091	—
1871	2,202	+5.3%
1881	2,400	+9.0%
1901	2,534	+5.6%
1911	2,498	−1.4%

Year	Pop.	±%
1921	2,544	+1.8%
1931	2,731	+7.4%
1936	2,973	+8.9%
1951	3,088	+3.9%
1961	2,686	−13.0%

Year	Pop.	±%
1971	1,971	−26.6%
1981	2,198	+11.5%
1991	2,481	+12.9%
2001	3,015	+21.5%

Source: Data from ISTAT
