= San Domenico, Cingoli =

Church in Cingoli, Italy

Coordinates: 43.37356°N 13.21801°E

San Domenico is a Baroque-style, Roman Catholic church and convent located on via Piazzale Mestica in the town of Cingoli, province of Macerata, region of Marche, Italy.

== History ==
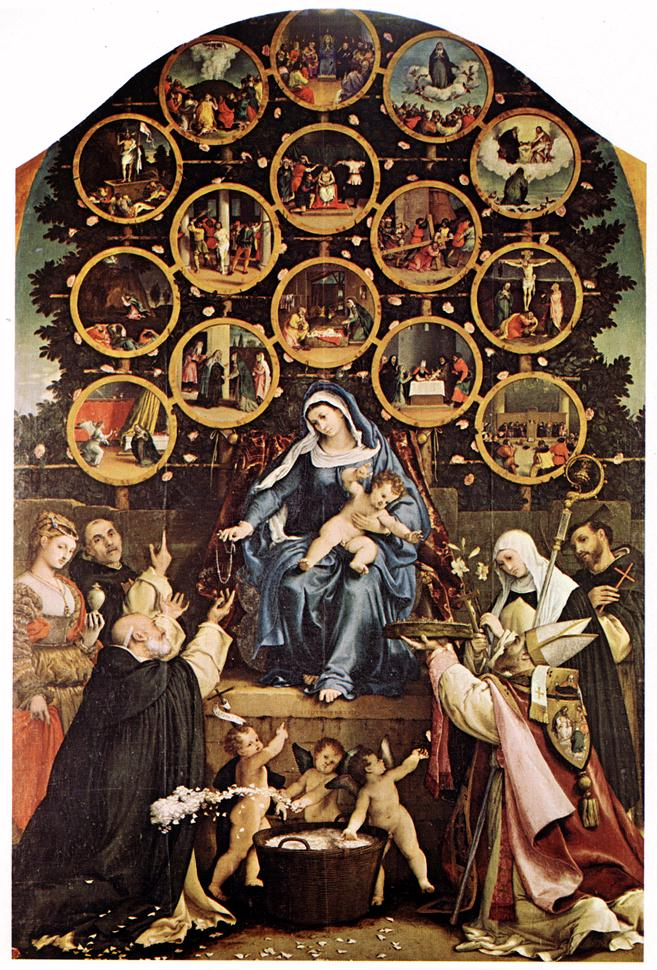
Madonna del Rosario by Lorenzo Lotto, with numerous small scenes of the life of Mary and Jesus that are recalled by the prayers of the Rosary.

The convent of the Dominican order is documented since the 13th century; its buildings have undergone many reconstructions. The church has a single nave with a semicircular apse. In the 16th century, seven chapels, patronized by local aristocracy were added, as well as the bell tower.

In 1727, the former church was razed, and a new Baroque style building was erected by the architects Arcangelo Vici, and his son Andrea. The nave has an oval layout with niches at the four corners. The main altar shelters the Madonna del Rosario painted by Lorenzo Lotto, and commissioned in 1539 by the local Confraternity of Rosary.
