= Vincenzo Albrici =

Italian composer

Vincenzo Albrici (26 June 1631 in Rome – 7 September 1687 in Prague) was an Italian composer, brother of Bartolomeo and nephew of Fabio and Alessandro Costantini.

Albrici was born as the son of singer who settled from Marche in Rome. In 1641 he became a student at the Collegium Germanicum et Hungaricum under Giacomo Carissimi. In 1647 he was paid as an organist in the Santa Maria in Vallicella.

Albrici was one of several musicians and composers residing in the court of Christina of Sweden in the first half of the seventeenth century and arrived to the court of Charles II of England in the 1660s.

Then Albrici became joint vice-kapellmeister with Giovanni Andrea Bontempi under Heinrich Schütz in Dresden (1659). Vincenzo's brother Bartolomeo Albrici, took up the position of organist. (Note: Bartolomeo was also a harpsichordist, singer and composer from whom two cantatas survive in Dresden.)

Vincenzo and his sister Leonora, also a singer, went to England and became part of the King's Italian Musicke. Bartolomeo joined them in 1666 and remained in England (Note: A biographical dictionary of actors, actresses, musicians, dancers, managers Philip H. Highfill.) when Vincenzo returned to Dresden. In 1681 he gained the post of organist at the Thomaskirche, a position which required conversion to Protestantism. A few months later, he moved to the Augustine church of St. Thomas, in Mala Strana, Prague for the rest of his life. (Note: A son was recommended by John Blow to the Earl of Rutland, but nothing further of this son is known.)

== Works, editions and recordings ==
Most of his works in Dresden were destroyed in the nine-day July 1760 bombardment of Dresden by the Prussian army, but 35 vocal works survive in the Düben collection in Uppsala.

- Concerti Sacri a 1, 2, 3 voci con strumenti, Cappella Augustana Matteo Messori. Label: Musica Rediviva.
