= Santa Maria della Castellaretta, Staffolo =

Church building in Staffolo, Italy

The Santa Maria della Castellaretta is a Renaissance-style, Roman Catholic church located on the road to San Paolo di Jesi, just outside of the town of Staffolo, province of Ancona, region of Marche, Italy.

== History ==
The church was built either atop a castle, using fragments of an earlier church. It includes stones with an inscription dated 1270 with the name of a builder by the name of Jacopo Cingoli. A prior church named San Salvatore was located nearby. The church was erected as an ex voto after 1571 by soldiers returning victorious from the Battle of Lepanto. The interiors were refurbished with Baroque-style stuccoes in 1683, in celebration of the defeat of the Ottomans during the Battle of Vienna.
