= San Francesco, Cingoli =

Roman Catholic church in Cingoli, Italy

Coordinates: 43.37551°N 13.21665°E

San Francesco is a Baroque-style, Roman Catholic church located in the town of Cingoli, province of Macerata, region of Marche, Italy.

== History ==
A Romanesque-style church at the site was erected by 1225 and served as head of the provincial chapter for the Frati Conventuali (Franciscan order). The church and convent were rebuilt in the 18th century. The design is attributed to Maestro Giacomo da Cingoli. Only the walls, base of the bell tower, and portals (moved to right side of nave) remain of the original church. The brick façade with flanking white stone pilasters dates from the second half of the 18th century. The interior houses a painted wooden crucifix from the 16th century and a number of altarpieces.
