= Cingoli =

- Comune
- Comune di Cingoli
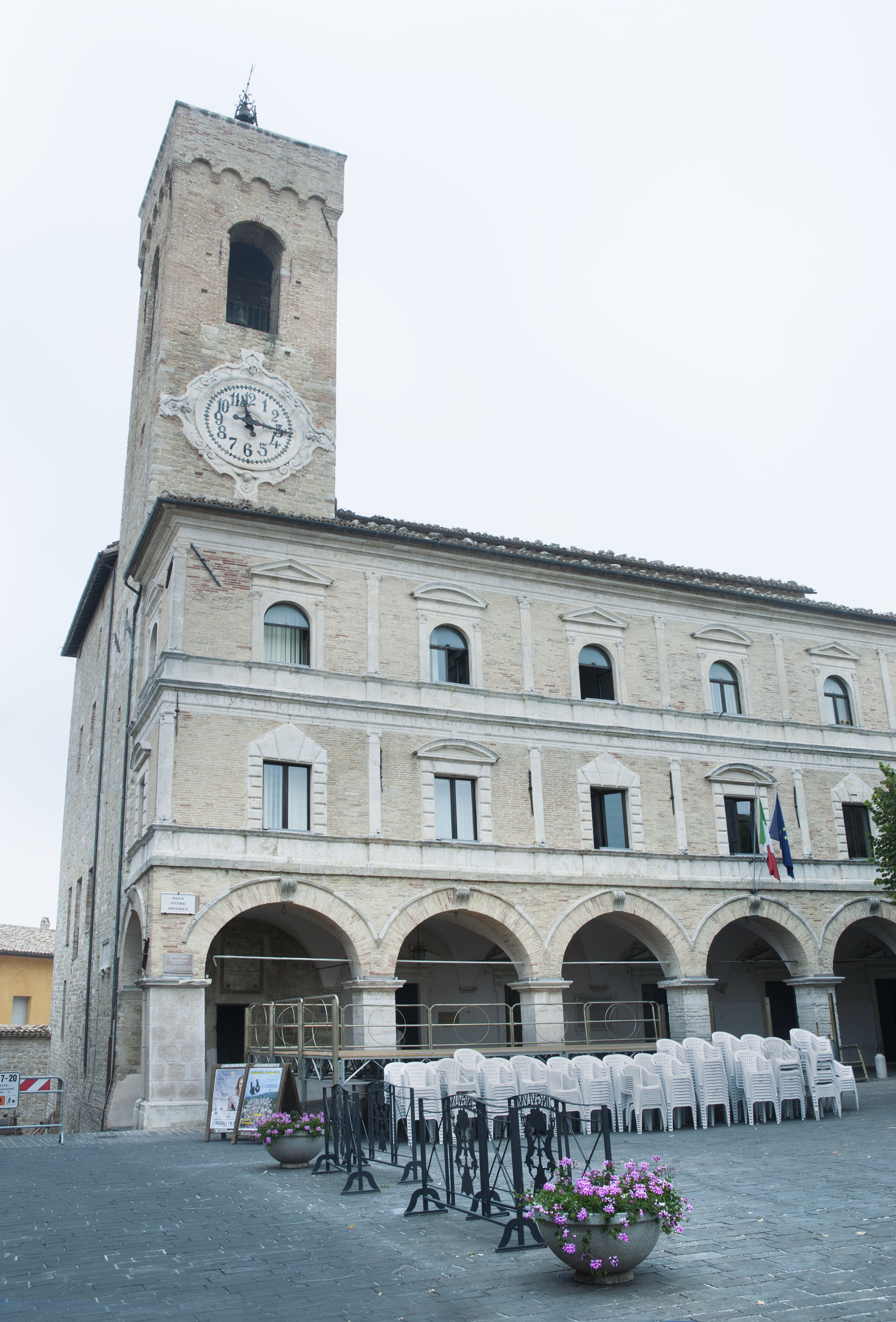
- Palazzo Comunale (Townhall)

- Coat of arms

- Cingoli within the province of Macerata

- Location within Italy Location within Marche
- Coordinates: 43°22′N 13°13′E
- Country: Italy
- Region: Marche
- Province: Macerata (MC)
- Frazioni: Avenale, Botontano, Capo di Rio, Carciole, Castel Sant'Angelo, Castreccioni, Cervidone I, Cervidone II, Civitello, Colcerasa, Grottaccia, Lago Castreccioni, Marcucci, Moscosi, Mummuiola; Pian della Pieve, Piancavallino, Pozzo, Saltregna, San Faustino, San Flaviano, San Venanzo, San Vittore, Santa Maria del Rango, Santo Stefano, Strada, Torre, Torrone, Troviggiano, Valcarecce

Government
  - Mayor: Michele Vittori

Area
  - Total: 147 km^{2} (57 sq mi)
- Elevation: 631 m (2,070 ft)

Population (31 December 2006)
  - Total: 10,540
  - Density: 71.7/km^{2} (186/sq mi)
- Demonym: Cingolani
- Time zone: UTC+1 (CET)
  - Summer (DST): UTC+2 (CEST)
- Postal code: 62011
- Dialing code: 0733
- Patron saint: St. Esuperanzio
- Saint day: January 24th
- Website: Official website

Cingoli is a town and comune of the Marches, Italy, in the province of Macerata, about 27 kilometres (17 mi) by road from the town of Macerata. It is the birthplace of Pope Pius VIII. It is one of I Borghi più belli d'Italia ("The most beautiful villages of Italy").

== History ==
The town occupies the site of the ancient Cingulum, a town of Picenum, founded and strongly fortified by Julius Caesar's lieutenant Titus Labienus (probably on the site of an earlier village) in 63 BCE at his own expense. Its lofty position at an elevation of about 650 metres (2,130 ft) made it of some importance in the civil wars, but otherwise little is heard of it. Under the Roman Empire it was a municipium.

== Main sights ==
Cingoli is also known as the "Balcony of Marche" ("Il Balcone delle Marche") because of its belvedere (viewpoint) from which, on a clear day, the sight may encompass all of the Marche and further across the Adriatic Sea to the Croatian mountain tops.

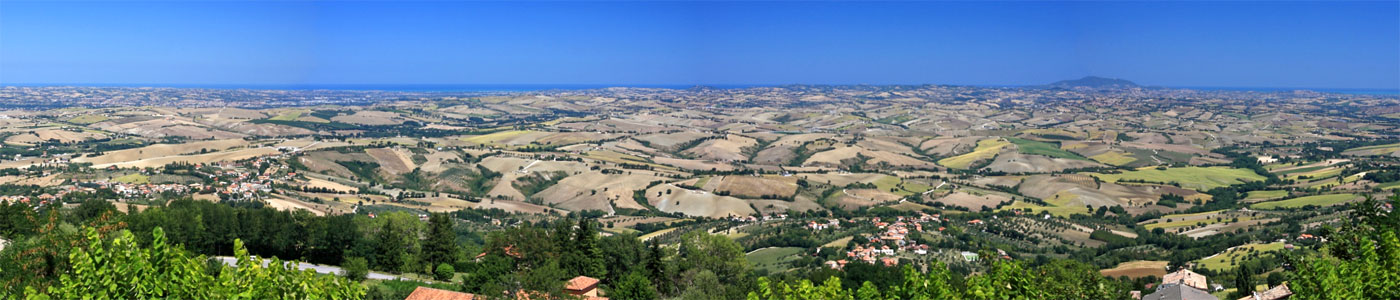
View of the Marche landscape from the Balcone delle Marche viewpoint

=== Religious buildings ===
- Cingoli Cathedral (Concattedrale di Santa Maria Assunta)
- Collegiate church of Sant'Esuperanzio, Cingoli (Collegiata di Sant'Esuperanzio): Gothic church
- Santuario di Santa Sperandia
- San Benedetto
- San Francesco
- San Filippo Neri
- San Giacomo
- San Girolamo
- San Nicolò
- Santo Spirito
- Santa Caterina d'Alessandria
- San Domenico

=== Secular buildings ===
- Palazzo municipale
- Biblioteca Comunale ″Ascariana″

=== Museums ===
- Pinacoteca comunale "D. Stefanucci" named after Donatello Stefanucci
- Museo archeologico statale di Cingoli
- Museo del Lago
- Museo del Sidecar

== Sport ==
Cingoli has been host to the Italian Sidecarcross Grand Prix a number times and have hosted on 16 May 2010.

== Twin towns — sister cities ==
Cingoli is twinned with:

- Aprilia, Lazio, Italy (2004)
