= Paintings in the staircase of the Kunsthistorisches Museum =

The staircase of the Kunsthistorisches Museum in Vienna is equipped with spandrel and intercolumniation paintings by Gustav Klimt, Ernst Klimt and Franz Matsch, lunette pictures by Hans Makart and a ceiling painting by Mihály Munkácsy.

== History ==
In the middle of 1881 the committee in charge of building in Vienna commissioned Hans Makart with the overall equipment of the large staircase. However, since Makart died in 1884, only the lunette pictures had been completed by then and could be affixed to the walls of the museum. The committee had to look for other artists for the missing spandrel and intercolumniation paintings. In 1885 Hans Canon was initially entrusted with the ceiling painting, but he also died a few months later. Finally, Mihály Munkácsy was commissioned to paint the ceiling with Apotheosis of the Renaissance, which was completed in the middle of 1890. The Maler-Compagnie, in which the brothers Gustav and Ernst Klimt as well as Franz Matsch had merged, was to carry out the spandrel and intercolumniation pictures. The works were completed in 1891. Concept and naming of the interior came from Albert Ilg.

== Ceiling painting: Mihály Munkácsy ==
Munkácsy's Apotheosis of the Renaissance seems like a building of the Renaissance with a dome, which is opened to the sky. In a loggia one can see the pope, below Michelangelo, Leonardo da Vinci and Raphael. Tizian gives lessons in painting, and Paolo Veronese stands on a framework. Personalized representations of fame and glory of the arts hover above – Pheme and Glory.

== Plan ==
			альт=	альт=	альт=			
			Makart Michaelangelo	Makart Allegory of painting	Makart Titian			
			Gustav Klimt Roman and Venetian Quattrocento	Gustav Klimt Ancient Greece and Egypt	Gustav Klimt Old Italian art			
альт=	Makart Rubens	Ernst Klimt Holland and Flemish school				Ernst Klimt German Renaissance	Makart Van Dyck	альт=
альт=	Makart Rembrandt	Franz Matsch Barocco and Rococo				Ernst Klimt Spain and Netherlands	Makart Velazquez	альт=
альт=	Makart Raphael	Gustav Klimt Florentine Cinquecento and Quattrocento				Ernst Klimt Italian High Renaissance	Makart Leonardo da Vinci	альт=
			Mihály Munkácsy. Apotheosis of the Renaissance					
			Franz Matsch Karolingian and Burgundian time	Franz Matsch Roman and Byzantine art, Roman Antique	Franz Matsch North Gothic in the Late Middle Ages			
			альт=	альт=	альт=			
			Makart Durer	Makart Allegory of sculpture	Makart Holbein			
