= Ernst Klimt =

Austrian painter (1864–1892)

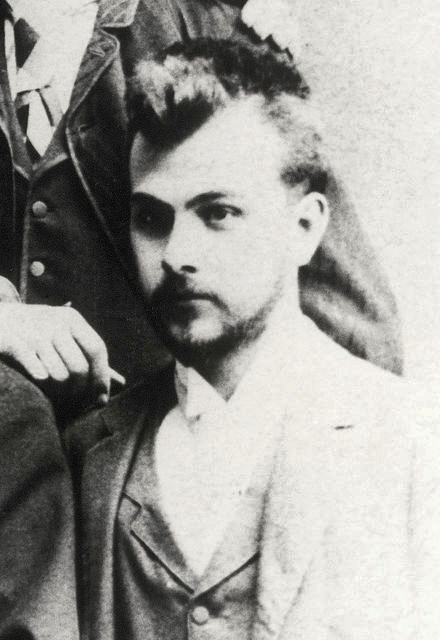
Ernst Klimt (1881)

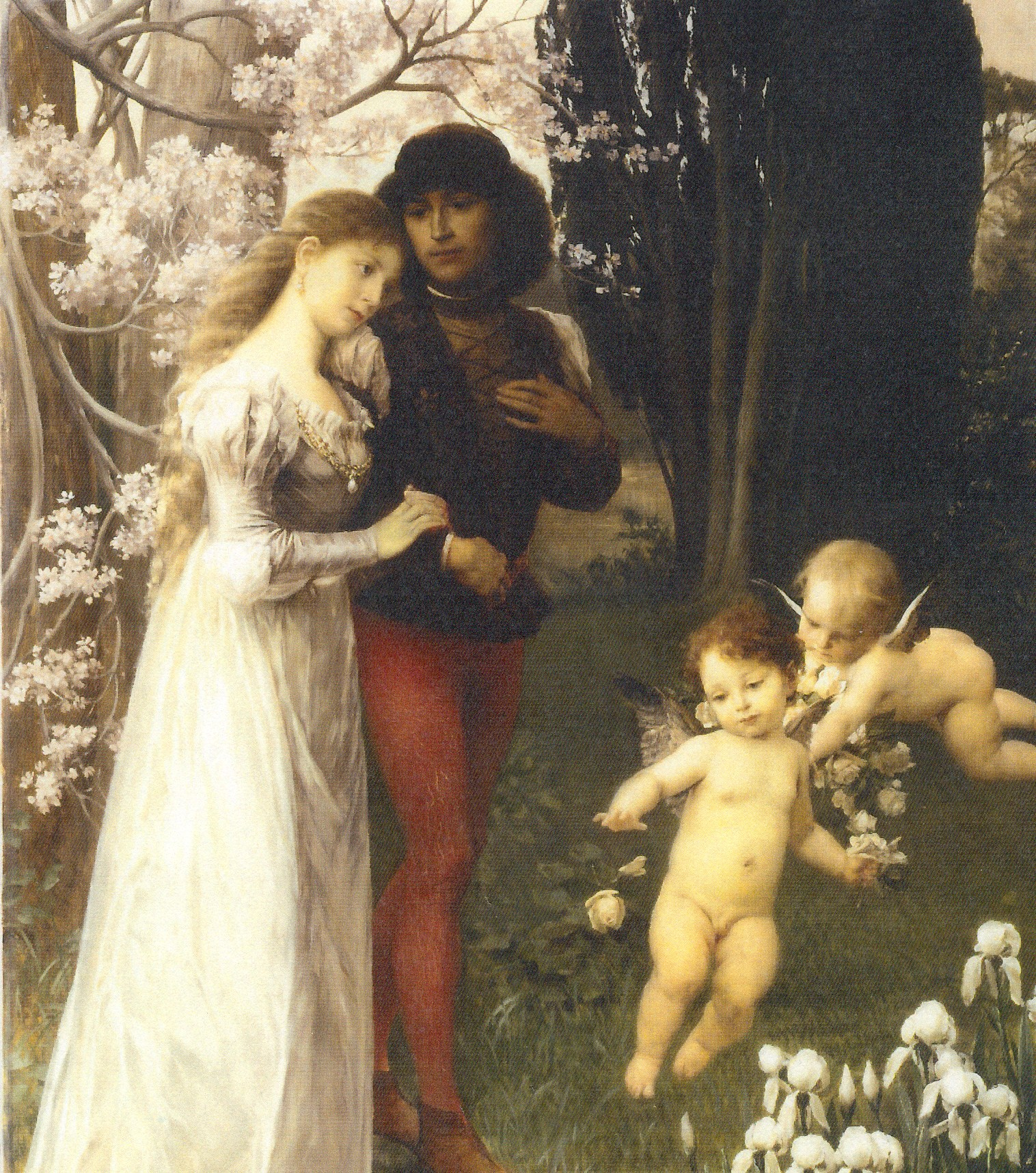
Before the Wedding Österreichische Galerie Belvedere

Ernst Klimt (3 January 1864 in Vienna – 9 December 1892 in Vienna) was an Austrian history painter and decorative painter. He was a younger brother of the better-known artist Gustav Klimt.

== Biography ==
He was the third of seven children born to the gold engraver, Ernst Klimt (1834–1892), originally from Bohemia, and was raised under very modest circumstances.

In 1877, aged only thirteen, he became a student at the University of Applied Arts, where his older brother, Gustav, had been studying for a year. They were both students of the decorative painter and engraver, Ferdinand Laufberger, and would become his assistants on several projects. He also introduced them to Hans Makart, who employed them for what is now known as the "Makart-Festzug", celebrating the silver anniversary of Emperor Franz Joseph I and his wife, Elisabeth.

After Laufberger's death, in 1881 he, Gustav, and their friend from school, Franz Matsch, founded the "Künstler-Compagnie" and, two years later, opened their own studio. Among other things, their company created curtains and ceiling paintings for theaters in Reichenberg, Karlsbad and Fiume. They also produced ceiling paintings for the Hermesvilla and frescoes for the stairwell of the new Burgtheater. In 1890, they helped complete paintings in the staircase of the Kunsthistorisches Museum, which had been left unfinished by Makart, several years before. Ernst's largest solo commissions were at Mondsee Castle and Peleș Castle in Romania.

In 1891, he married Helene Flöge (1871-1936), the sister of Gustav's friend, Emilie Flöge, and they had a daughter; also named Helene.

He died unexpectedly, from an inflammation of the pericardium. Gustav took care of his wife and daughter and completed his unfinished paintings. His company was officially dissolved, but Gustav maintained professional contact with Matsch until 1900. He was interred at the Baumgartner Friedhof, next to his father, who had died only a few months earlier.

== Sources ==
- "Klimt Ernst (Ernest)". In: Österreichisches Biographisches Lexikon 1815–1950 (ÖBL). Vol. 3, Austrian Academy of Sciences, Vienna 1965, p. 408 f. (Direct links to "p. 408", "p. 409")
- Alfred Weidinger, Agnes Husslein-Arco: Gustav Klimt und die Künstler-Compagnie. Belvedere, Vienna 2007, ISBN 978-3-901508-33-2
- Alfred Weidinger: "Gedanken über die Gebrüder Klimt und die viktorianische Malerei." In: Schlafende Schönheit. Belvedere, Vienna 2010, pp. 113–124. ISBN 978-3-901508-83-7
