= Ferdinand Laufberger =

Austrian painter and etcher

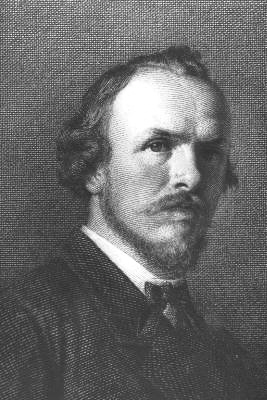
- Self-portrait (date unknown)
- Born: Ferdinand Laufberger; 16 February 1829
- Died: 16 July 1881 (aged 52)

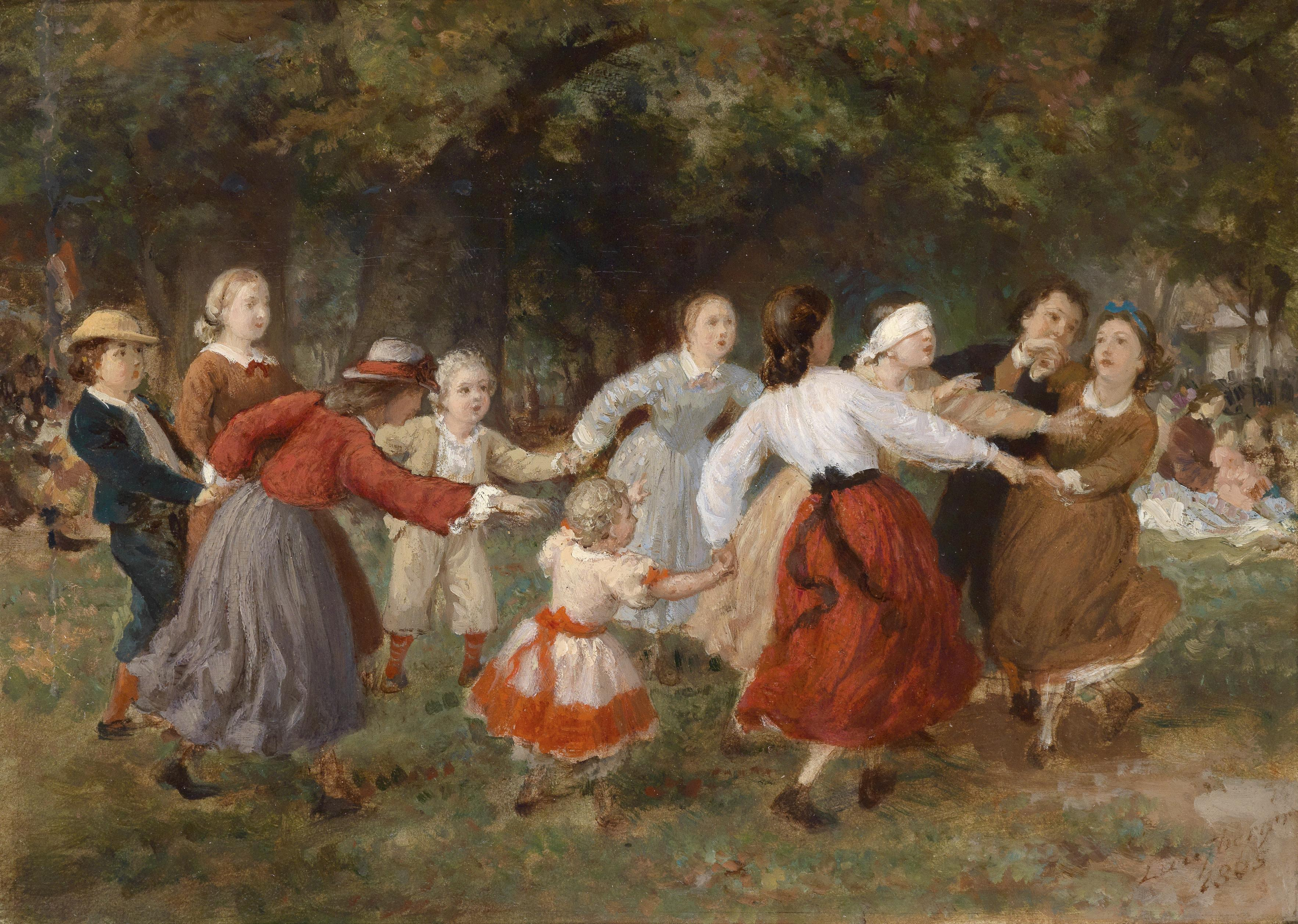
The Blind Cow Game (Blind man's buff)

Ferdinand Julius Wilhelm Laufberger (16 February 1829, Mariaschein – 16 July 1881, Vienna) was an Austrian painter and etcher.

== Biography ==
Laufberger trained at both the Academy of Fine Arts, Prague, and the Academy of Fine Arts, Vienna. He initially painted genre scenes of peasant and village life then, in 1855, on behalf of Österreichischer Lloyd (a shipping company), travelled through the Danube Vilayet to Istanbul, creating a series of drawings that were made into popular engravings. While in Istanbul, Laufberger made several connections with Caucasus Germans that had settled in Istanbul, and the material he drew from them provided inspiration to his later work.

A two-year travel grant from the Vienna Academy enabled him to visit several important art venues, beginning with Germany and Belgium. By 1862, he had visited London and Paris, then ended in Italy. In 1865, after returning to Vienna, he was entrusted with painting the curtain at the Komische Oper. Three years later, he was appointed Professor of figure drawing at the new University of Applied Arts.

He created several small decorative works then, in 1877, he was engaged by the Museum of Applied Arts to decorate their new building extension; creating a frieze in sgraffito and frescoes on the stairwell, depicting Venus, rising from the sea, surrounded by the arts. Two years later, he was commissioned to create decorations for the courtyard at the Kunsthistorisches Museum (then under construction); hiring two assistants: Ernst and Gustav Klimt.

He continued to paint genre scenes as well, and his later ones tended to be humorous in character. He also designed the stained glass, created by Carl Geyling, in the Industrial Hall at the 1873 Vienna World's Fair.

In 1889, a street in Leopoldstadt was renamed the "Laufbergergasse" in his honor.

== Sources ==
- Constantin von Wurzbach: "Laufberger, Ferdinand." In: Biographisches Lexikon des Kaiserthums Oesterreich (Biographical Lexicon of the Empire of Austria). Part 14 Kaiserlich-königliche Hof- und Staatsdruckerei, Vienna 1865, p. 220 f. (digitalised).
- Theodor Frimmel von Traisenau (1883). "Laufberger, Ferdinand" . Allgemeine Deutsche Biographie (in German). Vol. 18. Leipzig: Duncker & Humblot. pp. 40–42.
- Werner Kitlitschka (1982). "Laufberger, Ferdinand". Neue Deutsche Biographie (in German). Vol. 13. Berlin: Duncker & Humblot. pp. 707–708. (full text online).
- Gitta Ho: "Laufberger, Ferdinand Julius Wilhelm" In: Bénédicte Savoy and France Nerlich (Eds.): Pariser Lehrjahre. Ein Lexikon zur Ausbildung deutscher Maler in der französischen Hauptstadt. Vol. 2: 1844–1870., Walter de Gruyter, 2015 ISBN 978-3-11-029064-6
