= Scroll painting =

Scroll painting usually refers to a painting on a scroll in Asian traditions, distinguishing between:

- Handscroll, such a painting in horizontal format
- Hanging scroll, such a painting in vertical format
