= Franz von Matsch =

Austrian painter and sculptor

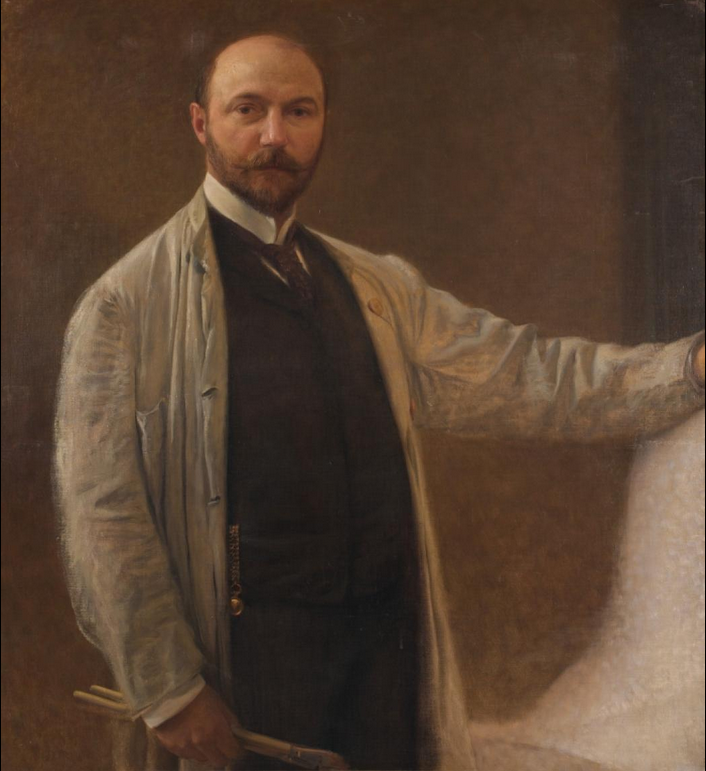

Franz Josef Karl Edler von Matsch (16 September 1861, in Vienna – 5 October 1942, in Vienna), also known as Franz Matsch, was an Austrian painter and sculptor in the Jugendstil style. Along with Gustav and Ernst Klimt, he was a member of the Maler-Companie. He painted Achilles in Achillion Museum in Corfu.
