= Musée alsacien =

Musée alsacien may refer to:

- Musée alsacien (Haguenau)
- Musée alsacien (Strasbourg)
