= Kelsch d'Alsace =

Linen and cotton textile from France

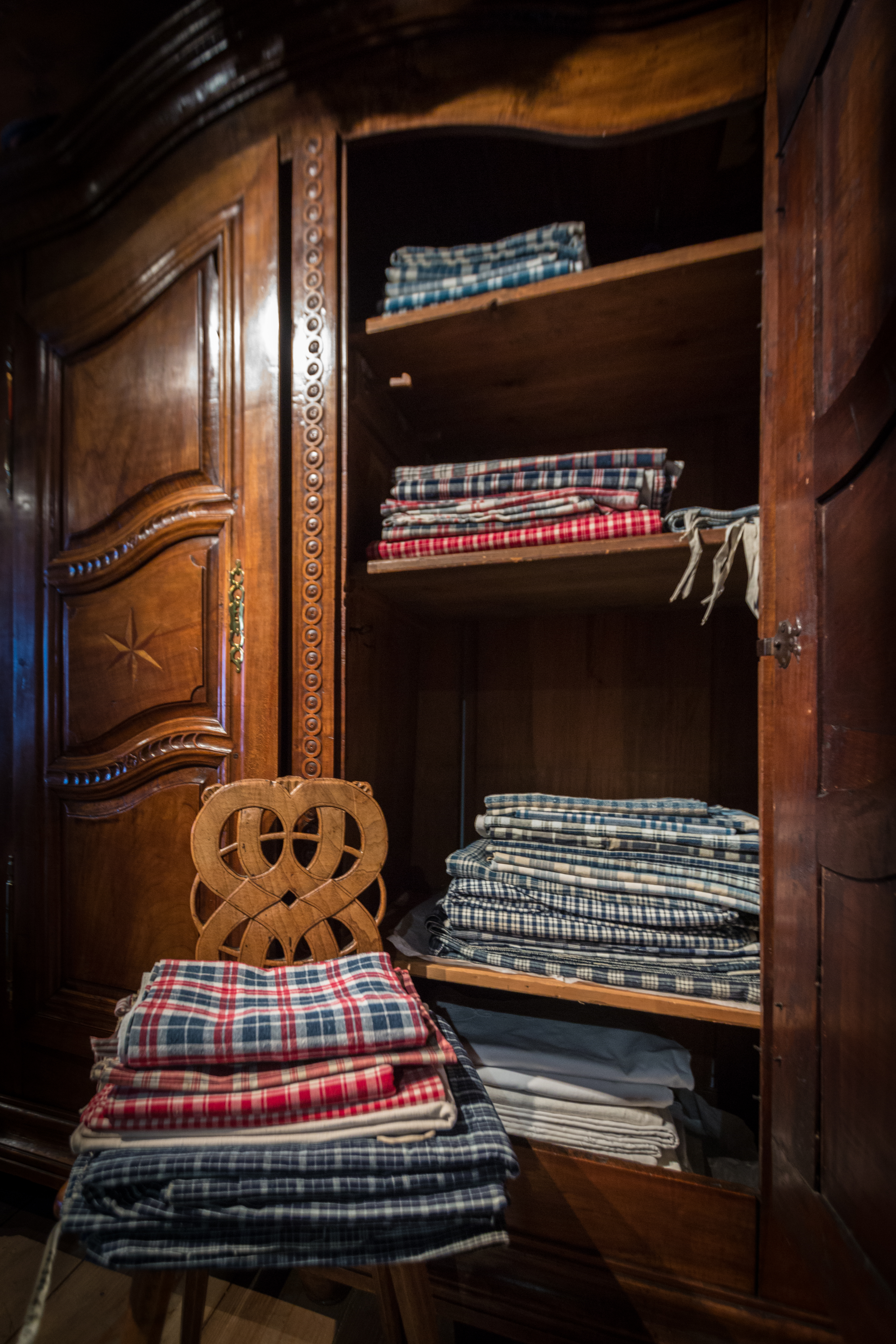
Kelsch d'Alsace at Musée alsacien.

Kelsch d'Alsace is textile of linen and cotton manufactured in Alsace, France.

== Bibliography ==
- Gilles Pudlowski, « Kelsch », in Dictionnaire amoureux de l’Alsace, Plon, Paris, 2010, p. 405-407. ISBN 978-2259209472
- « La dernière tisserande de kelsch », in En Alsace, 2008, No. 48, p. 66 (concerne la vallée de Masevaux)
- Claude Fuchs, « Kelsch histoire ! », in L’Alsace : découvertes et passions, 2002, No. 22, p. 48-57
- Jean-Marie Joseph, « Le Kelsch », in Annuaire de la Société des amis de la bibliothèque de Sélestat, 2007, No. 57, p. 157-160
- Véronique Julia et Christophe Dugied, « Bleu, blanc, rouge, kelsch », in Maisons Coté Est, 2000, No. 5, p. 78-85; 143
- Le Kelsch au fil du temps : exposition du 28 novembre 1999 au 24 septembre 2000, Truchtersheim, Maison du Kochersberg, Imprimerie Cathal, s. l., 1999, 24 p. (catalogue d'exposition)
