= Robert Einbeck =

French-American artist and poet

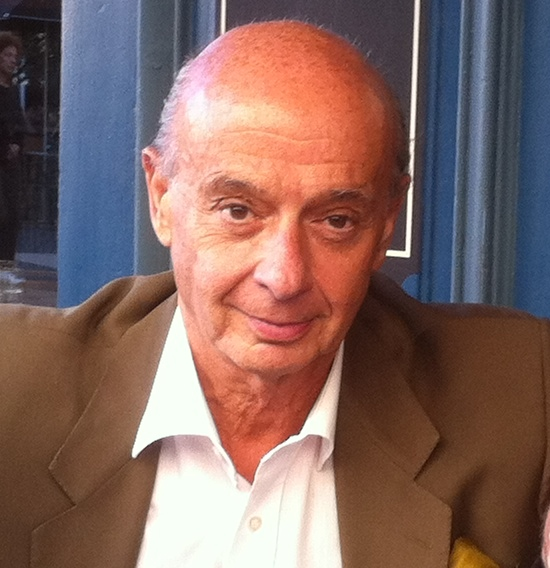

Robert Einbeck (born 1944) is an artist, poet, and contemporary painter. He was guided early on by the work of Vassily Kandinsky and Paul Klee. He was followed by Mark Rothko and Barnett Newman. The work he created during the 1970s focused essentially on form, sign, and light, and it led to his complete oeuvre that inspired a spiritual dimension. Seeing humanist values as the basis of any and all civilization, Robert Einbeck and his wife, Marion Einbeck, launched the project "The Einbeck's Time For Peace" in New York in 1989. This was followed by the Time For Peace Film & Music Awards in 1994, whose goal was to promote the films and music that conveyed these humanist values. When he returned to France after twenty years in the United States, Einbeck returned to his pictorial work, putting it in the service of others by developing an oeuvre centered primarily on serenity, beauty, and emotion. He also linked it to the new technologies of the time.

== Integration into the world of art ==
Einbeck was born in Paris in 1944. As a boy, he was passionate about poetry and photography. However, ignoring his artistic inclinations, his stepfather registered him at a commercial institution, and then at a training school for jewelry.

After a brief stay in London where he took courses at the Courtauld Institute of Art, Einbeck went back to France, devoting himself to his passion, poetry, and was soon rubbing shoulders with the New Realism in Nice. He came to know the painter Raymond Moretti, who introduced him to Joseph Kessel and Louis Nucéra, who would become good friends.

Already delivering a message on the place of the human being in the universe, and facing his destiny, his "Poème Mécanique" (Mechanical Poem) of 1967, illustrated by Raymond Moretti, epitomized the spirit of the mechanical world in which contemporary man is held prisoner.

During this same period, Einbeck met Salvador Dalí, who suggested to him that he illustrate one of his poems, "H, comme bombe" (H, as in Bomb), for which Georges Ribemont-Dessaignes agreed to write the foreword.

In 1968 Einbeck, now assistant artistic director of Editions Draeger, produced two books: Les Dîners de Gala (Gala's Dinners) with Salvador Dalí and the Picasso de Draeger (Draeger’s Picasso) in collaboration with his friend, the photographer Edouard Qui.

== Einbeck's painting ==
Early in the 1970s Einbeck realized that poetry no longer completely fulfilled his expectations. He had to find a new way of expression so that he could raise the consciousness of a wider public about the message he wanted to convey.

That is why Einbeck turned to painting, adopting semiotics resulting from its treatment in the world of color, sign, and form. He was guided early on by emblematic figures of the early twentieth century such as Vassily Kandinsky and Paul Klee.

His encounter in 1971 with the work of Barnett Newman at his exhibition at the Grand Palais would come as a shock to Einbeck. The revelation would lead him toward a new artistic approach, particularly to a reflection upon certain cabalistic aspects that he was to develop in 1978.

This intellectual process grew broader through his study of the philosophic writings related to Tantrism, Zen, and the Tao. Subsequently, one recognizes the whole of Einbeck's spiritual progress, which has as its goal to direct viewers to an inner awareness, which will lead them to a greater understanding of the self, of the world around them, and of the relationships that exist between human beings.

1975 signified the start of Einbeck's career as a painter. His first exhibit received special attention from the entirety of the Parisian critics. Gilles Plazy, among others, stated that "Einbeck’s painting is a passage between the everyday world and the spiritual one. Esthetics is the communication between the physical and the metaphysical." Exhibitions followed one after the other: in 1978 at the Galerie de l'Esplanade with the ‘Abstraction Vivante’ (Living Abstraction) movement, which he created with the critic Gilles Plazy; in the early 80s at the Galerie du Chapitre, at the Galerie Für Junge Kunstler in Mannheim, Germany; at the Musée André Malraux; at the Galerie Charly l'Envers; and at the Galerie Patrice Landau. The FIAC in Paris also had a show of some of his works side by side with those of Max Ernst.

== The Time For Peace period ==
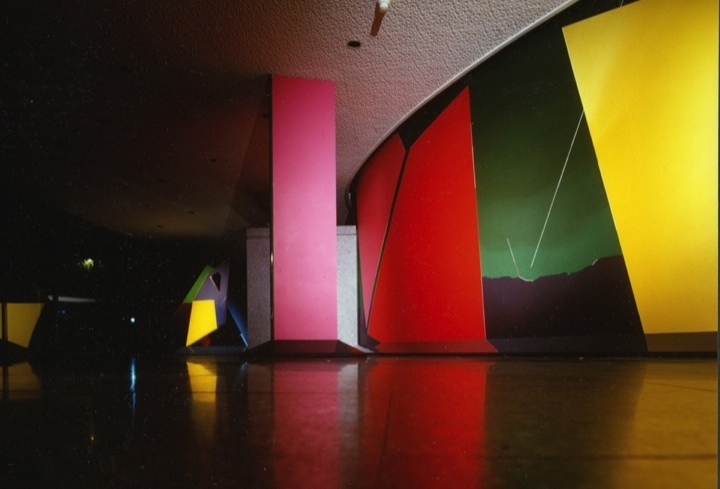
1987 - Einbeck Space at Sanofi France

In 1983 Einbeck met Marion, the woman who would become his wife. Subsequently, the Einbecks developed an idea by which to convey the humanist values so dear to them.

A space for contemplation, a recurrent theme in Einbeck's career, was a notion he had been elaborating since the early 1980s. Within the framework of his ideas of spaces, he studied the way in which, since the beginning of time, various civilizations have used colors, signs, and forms while deepening the spiritual contents. The Einbecks settled in the United States in 1989 in order to realize their project of creating a traveling space of contemplation, advocating humanist values and world peace, the 'Einbecks' Time For Peace Project'.

The Einbecks devoted the next twenty years of their lives to this project, which gave rise to the ‘Time For Peace Film & Music Awards’, created in 1994. The purpose of this annual ceremony was to award cinematographic and musical creations, which conveyed universal values such as tolerance, greater understanding between people, and respect for others.

== The return to painting ==
In 2012 Einbeck decided to abandon the ‘Time For Peace’ project in order to devote himself anew to his painting, leaving the organization in Marion’s hands.

A new way of thinking emerged in Einbeck around the violence inherent in life generally and in the human species in particular. In 2012 Einbeck wrote a manifesto on firearms and created twelve large canvases that made up the exhibition called ‘Bang!’ shown in 2013 at the Frost Art Museum in Miami, which is affiliated with the Smithsonian Institution in Washington, DC.

Coming out of this 'Barrel's Period’, Einbeck returned to the original initiative of his ‘Serenity Disks’. Basing his works on this spiritual and philosophical dimension inherent in his oeuvre, Einbeck again probed the essential problem of humankind’s place, its relationship with others and the quest for happiness and universal love.

== The Serenity Project ==
The Serenity Project is primarily aimed at patients and nursing staff who are isolated in hospitals due to the corona pandemic. Dozens of different "Disks of Serenity" were painted by the artist and, with the support of multimedia artists, turned into six different video and music sequences. This project is carried out together with a multidisciplinary team led by Professor Bourdarias at the Ambroise Paré hospital in Boulogne Billancourt.

- Serenity Opus One
- Serenity Opus Two
- Serenity Opus Three
- Serenity Opus Four
- Serenity Opus Five
- Serenity Opus Six

== Works cited ==
- Le Quotidien de Paris – 11 Août 1975 – "Un espace spirituel" par Gilles Plazy.
- Le Monde – 16 Août 1975 – "L’aube spirituelle" par Jean-Marie Dunoyer.
- Le Figaro – 24 Août 1975 – "Einbeck: de la poésie à la peinture", Sabine Marchand.
- Le Point – 25 Août 1975 – "Robert Einbeck", Hélène Demoriane.
- La Croix – 28/29 Septembre 1975 – "Robert Einbeck : L’au-delà de la poésie", Jeanine Baron.
- Le Quotidien de Paris – 23 Mars 1977 – "Einbeck: peinture et mandala", Annick Pely.
- Mannheimer Morgen – 18 Mars 1977 – "Farbig vibrierende Meditations-Bilder".
- Le Quotidien du Médecin – 7-8 Juillet 1978 – "Jouer sur les couleurs et les formes pour améliorer le cadre de vie."
- Le Quotidien de Paris – 8 Avril 1980 – "Le rêve métaphysique d’Einbeck", Gilles Plazy.
- La Croix – 16 Avril 1980 – "Einbeck : Peinture pour une nouvelle sérénité", Jeanine Baron.
- Maison Française – Mai 1981 – "Robert Einbeck où la couleur raisonnée" par Edouard Michel.
- The Waco Tribune Herald – 29 Mai 1981 – "Painter Seeks to Soothe, Relax", Bob Darden.
- Le Panorama du Médecin – 18 Mai 1982 – "Le "CERCLES" pour réconcilier l’homme avec son environnement", B. Bousquet.
- Beaux Arts magazine – 10 Février 1984 – "Einbeck: Peinture et Environnement", Cyd Ney.
- La Croix – 20/21 Avril 1986 – "Marion et Robert Einbeck: La Bible pour un jeu de sagesse".
- L’Impartial ouvert sur Robert Einbeck Plasticien – "La couleur à l’hôpital."
- L’Echo – 12 Décembre 1987 – "Au-delà d’une exposition de Noël", Jacques Meyer.
- La Croix – 1/2 Janvier 1988 – "Robert Einbeck à Bâle – La Force des Signes", Jeanine Baron.
- Herald Tribune – 22 Décembre 1987 – "Basel Show is Abstract with twist", Michael Gibson.
- Interior Design – Mars 1990 – Artwork – "Robert and Marion Einbeck transform a corporate lobby in France into a proper work of art", Edie Lee Cohen.
- Metropolis – May 1990 – "Designing for a new age" par Marisa Bartolucci.
- La Vie – 30 Avril 1992 – "Une fresque pour la Paix", Armelle Signargout.
- Washington Post – 1er février 1993 – "The Artistic Pursuit of Peace", Eric Brace.
