= Prix Jacques Chardonne =

French literary award

The prix Jacques Chardonne was a French literary prize that was awarded between 1986 and 1996. It was created to reward a French-language work, whether chronicle, essay, newspaper, story, short story or novel, that exhibited quality of style and freedom of mind. The winner was awarded 50,000 francs.

== List of laureates ==
- 1986: Gilles Pudlowski for L'Amour du Pays (Flammarion)
- 1987: Georges Borgeaud for Le Soleil sur Aubiac
- 1988: Pierre Veilletet for Mari-Barbola (Arléa)
- 1990: Denis Tillinac for Le Corrèze et le Zambèze (Robert Laffont)
- 1991: Louis Nucéra for Le Ruban rouge (Grasset)
- 1993: Amélie Nothomb for Le Sabotage amoureux (Albin Michel)
- 1996: Diane de Margerie for Dans la spirale (Éditions Gallimard)

== See also ==
- Jacques Chardonne
