= Musée historique de Haguenau =

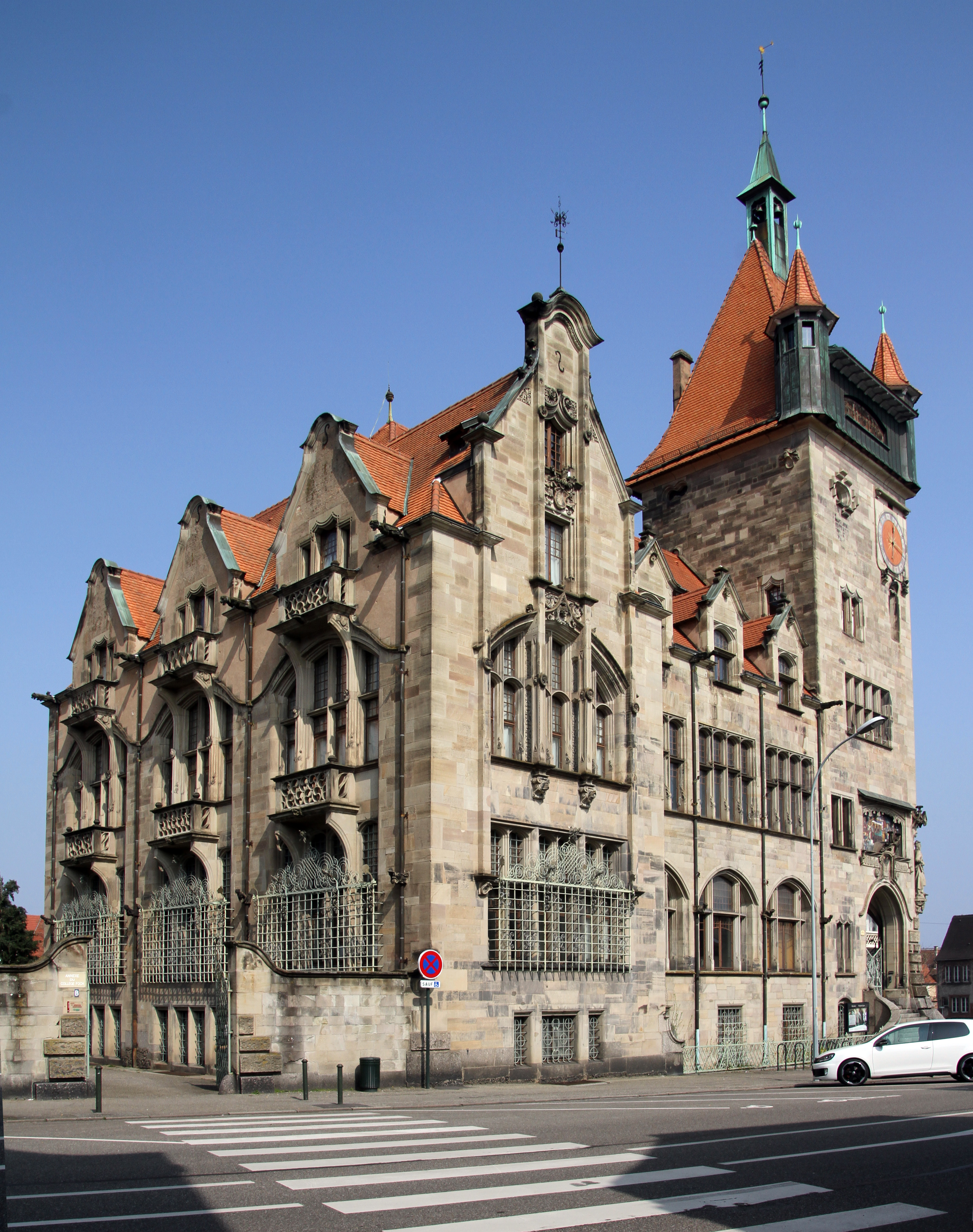
- Rear of the museum in March 2019
- Established: 1900
- Location: 9 Rue du Maréchal Foch, 67500 Haguenau, France
- Coordinates: 48°48′46″N 7°47′29″E
- Type: History museum Archaeological museum Art museum
- Public transit access: Bus Ritmo Line 1, stop Marché aux Grains
- Website: www.ville-haguenau.fr/musee-historique

The Musée historique (Historical museum) is one of the three museums of Haguenau, France. It was established in 1900 and inaugurated in 1905, when Haguenau was a German town and part of Alsace-Lorraine. In spite of its name, it is as much an art museum as a museum dedicated to History.

== History ==
The museum was founded by the mayor, Xavier Nessel, who was also a keen amateur archaeologist. The building was initially designed to house the municipal collections, the municipal archive and the municipal library. It was built by the architects Joseph Müller (1863–??) and Richard Kuder (1852–1912) who also designed the Strassburger Sängerhaus.

Apart from artefacts relating to the history of the town, including its Jewish community, the museum owns a rich collection of archaeological finds from the Neolithic, the Bronze Age, the Iron Age and the Gallo-Roman period. It also displays a number of Romanesque, Gothic, Renaissance and Baroque artworks from religious and secular buildings from the town and its surroundings; in many cases, those buildings themselves (such as Frederick Barbarossa's castle in Haguenau) have long disappeared. The museum also owns a collection of Strasbourg faience by the Hannong Family and a collection of modern art, including Art Nouveau glassware (among which the Henninger collection – 81 works by Gallé, Lalique, Daum, etc. and a cabinet by Majorelle – donated in 2014 and then worth €357,600 (equivalent to $486,334 in 2025)) and paintings.

The ethnographic and folk art collections relating to Alsace were moved to the Musée alsacien nearby in 1972.

== Gallery ==
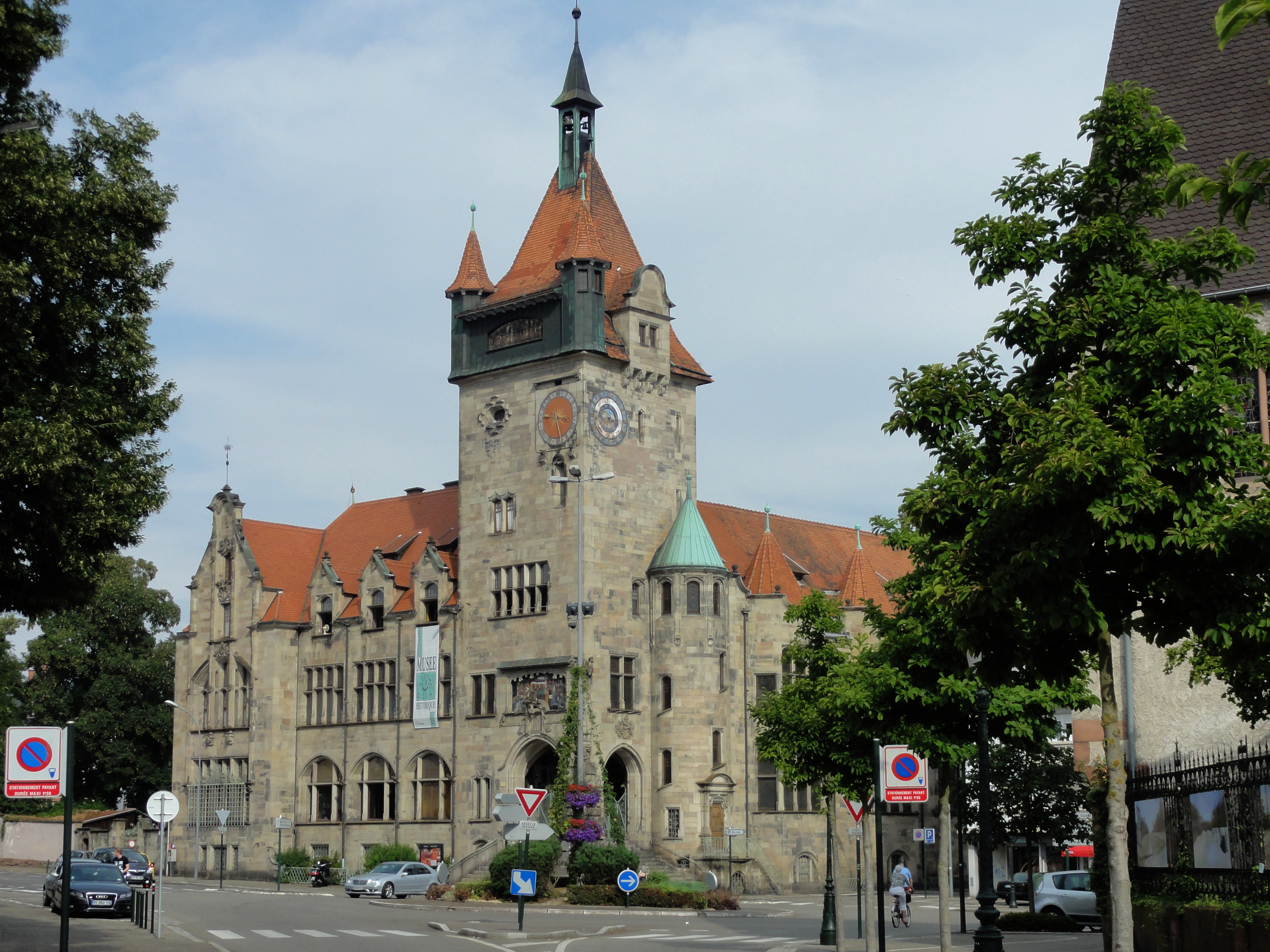
The building

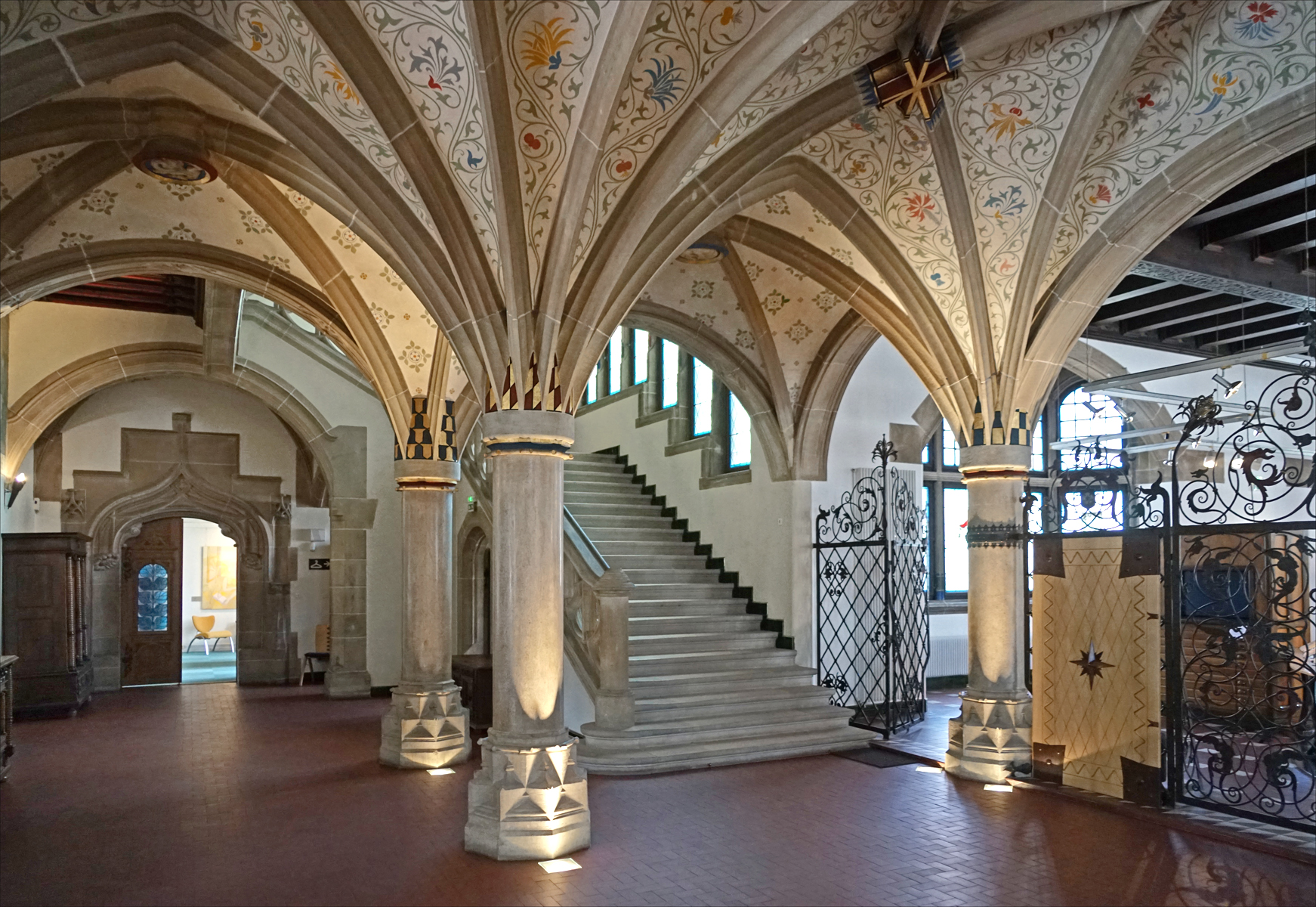
Inside the museum

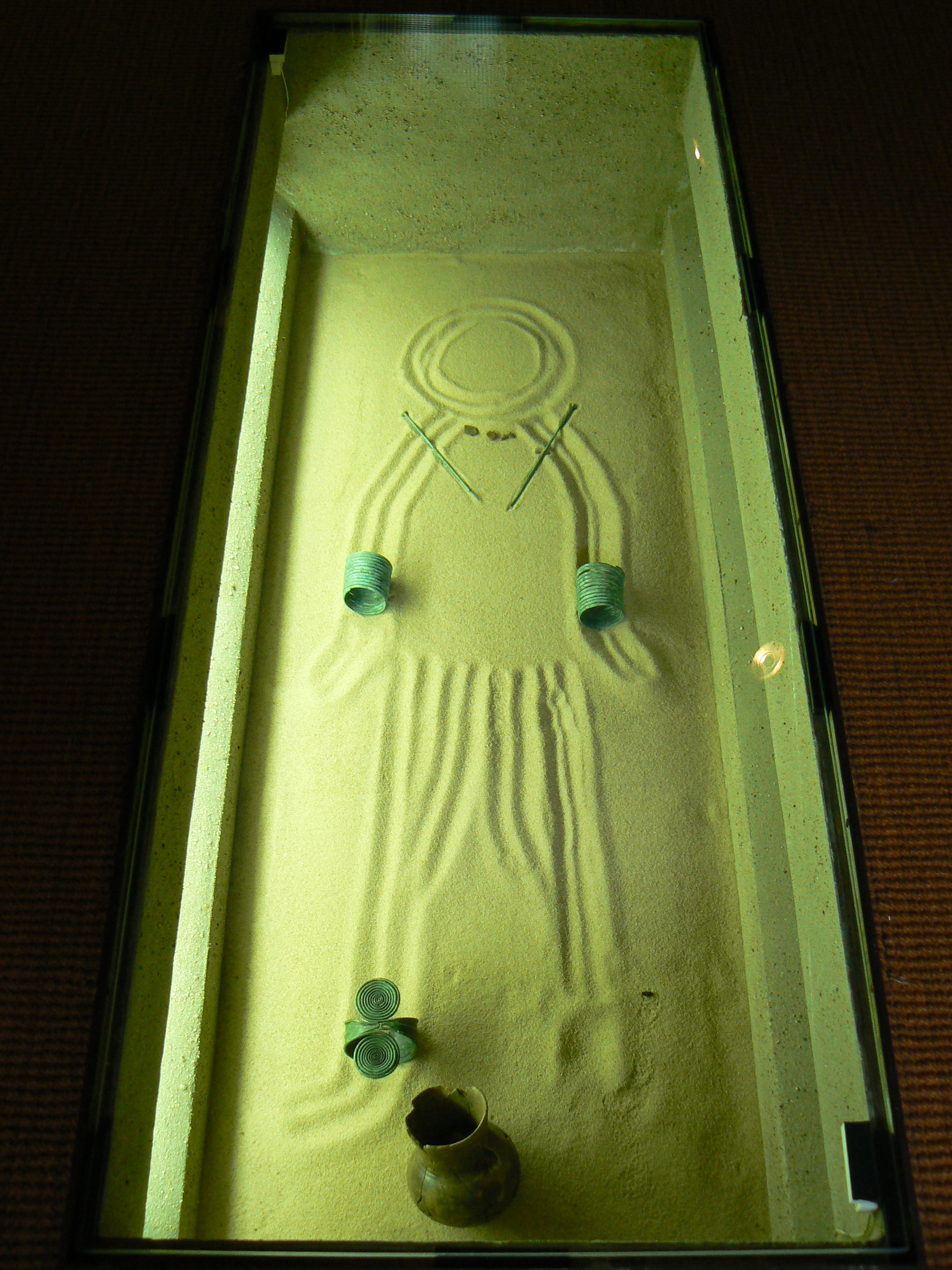
Prehistoric funerary objects

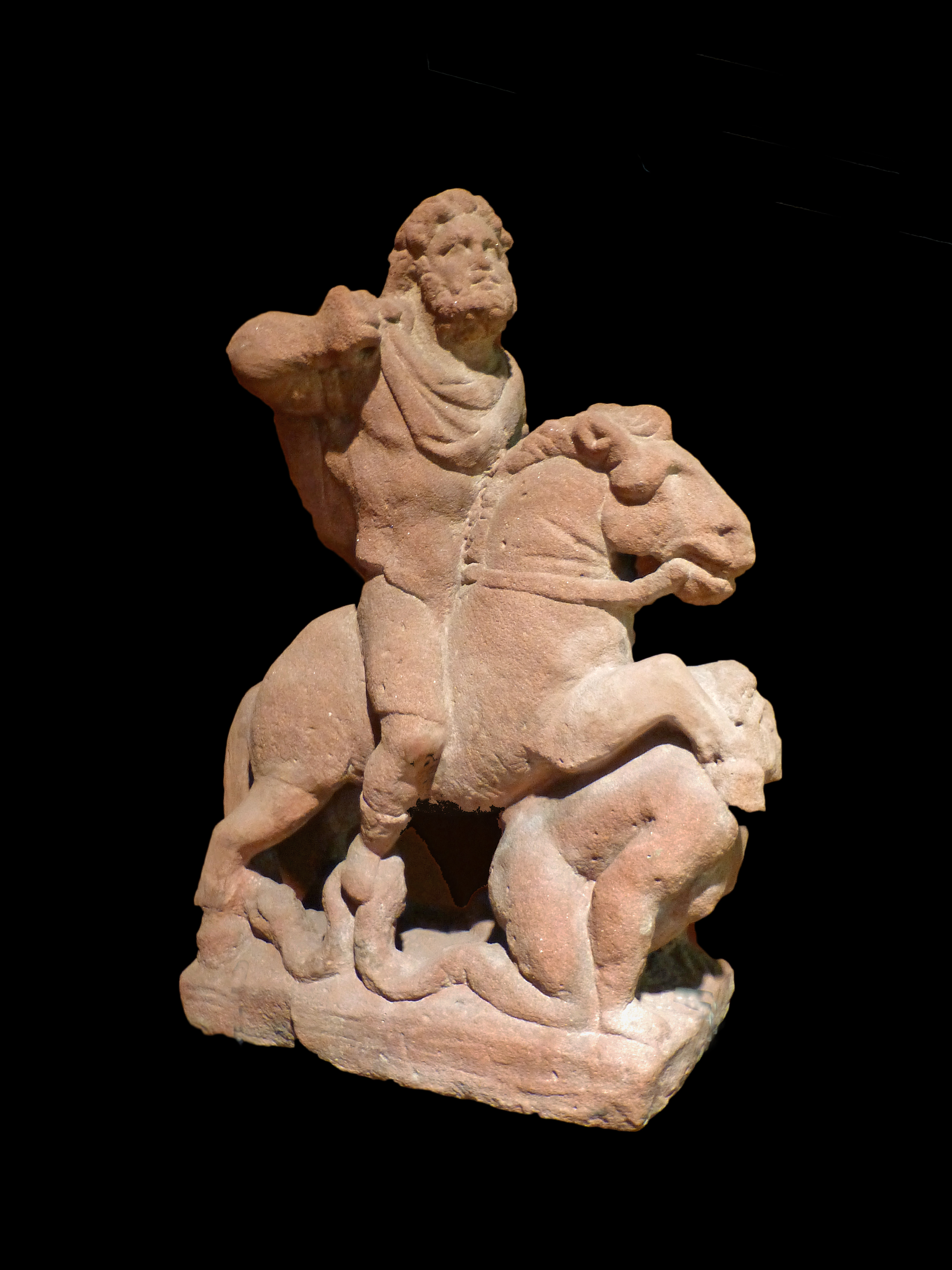
Jupiter Taranis, 2nd-century

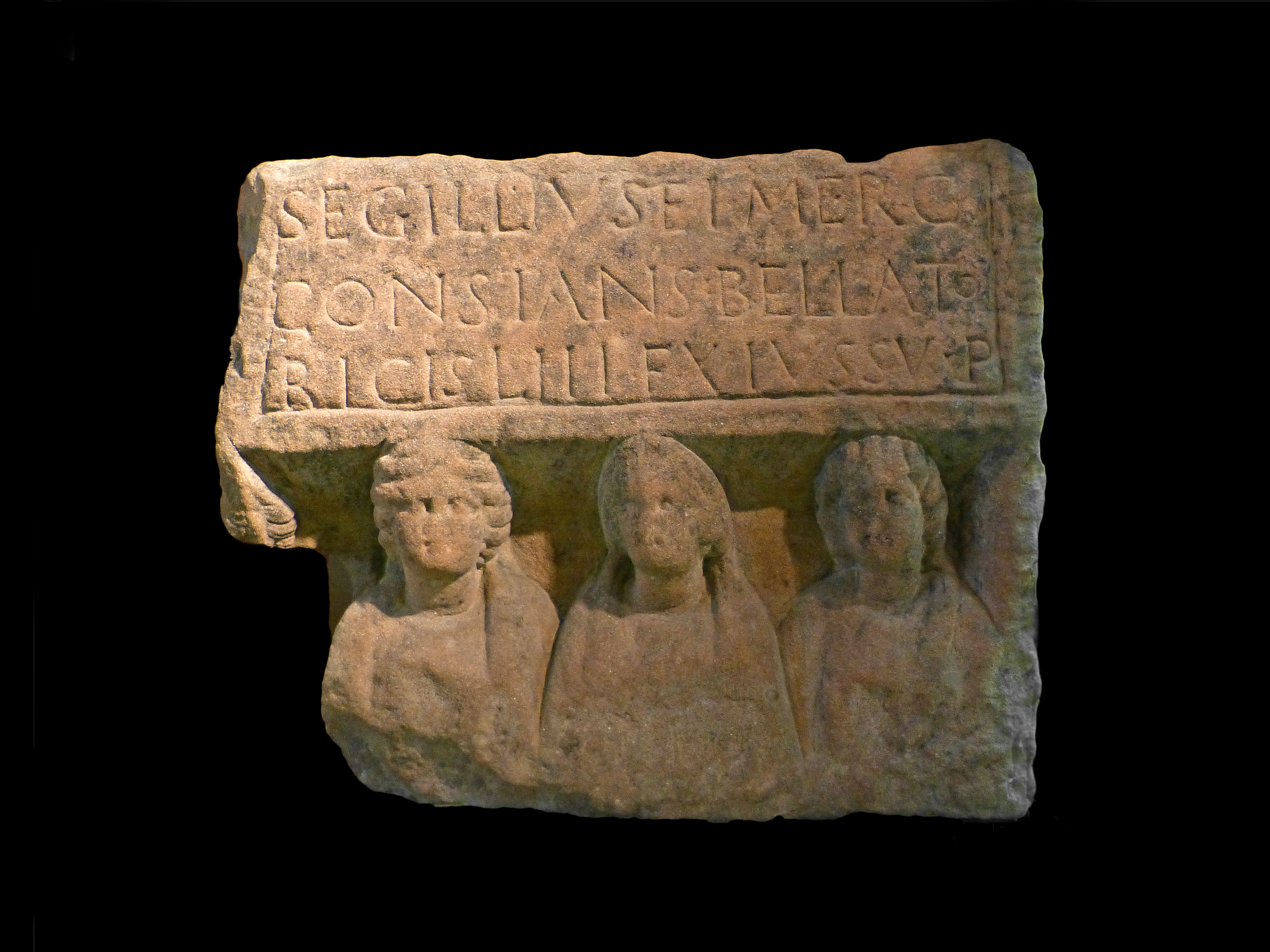
Stele with three Goddesses, 3rd-century

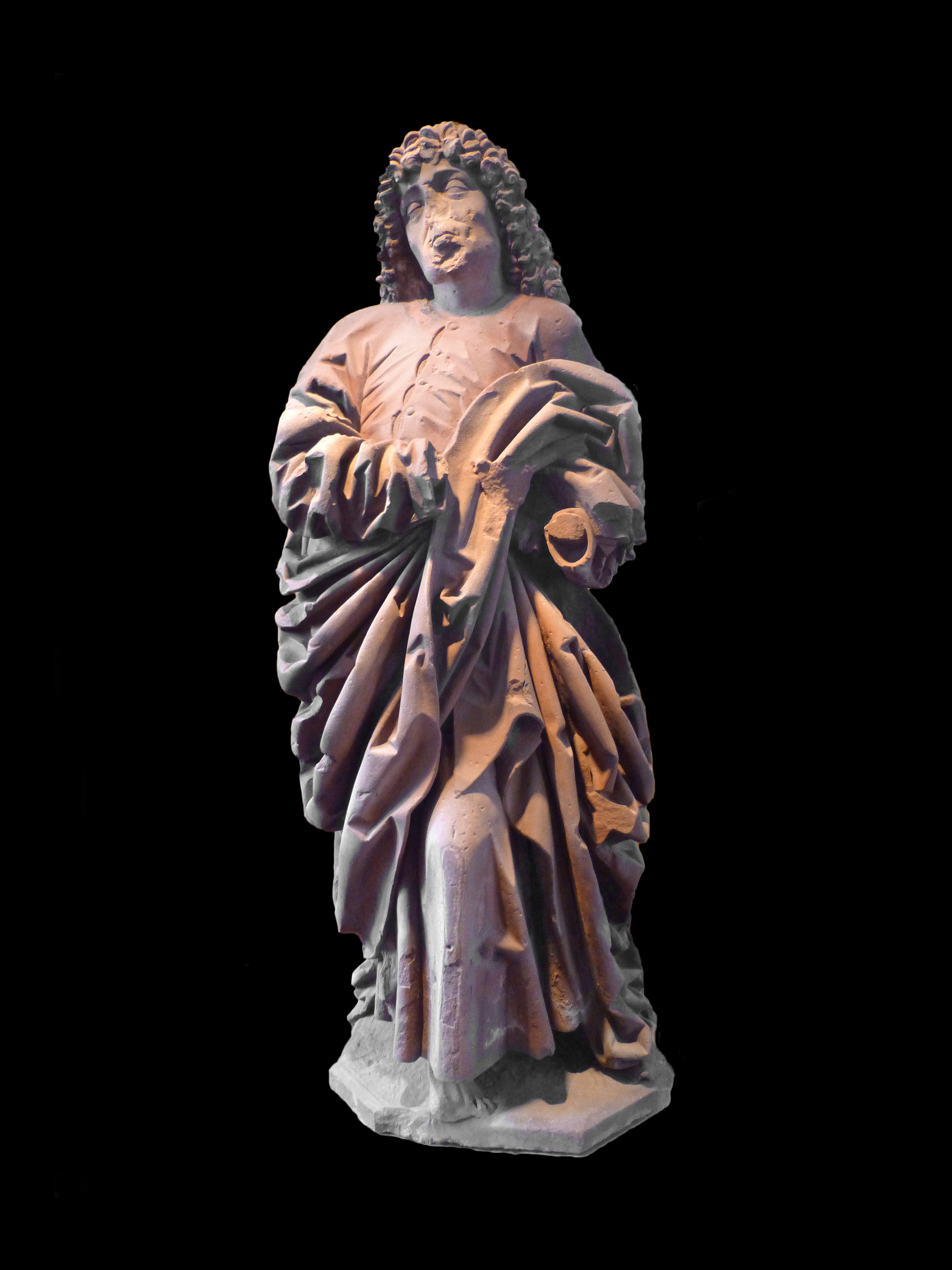
Saint John (Evangelist), 15th-century

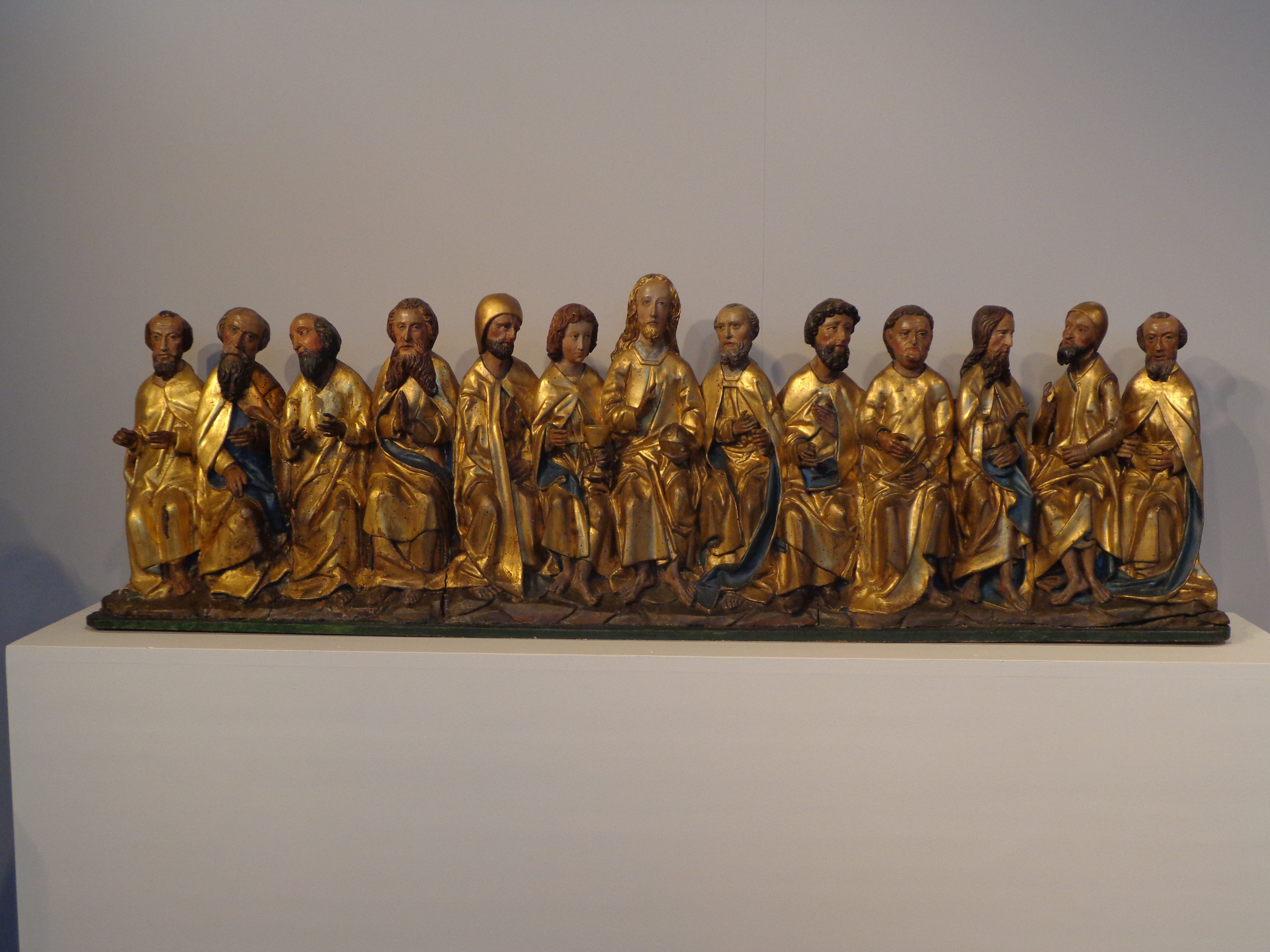
Christ and Apostles, 15th-century

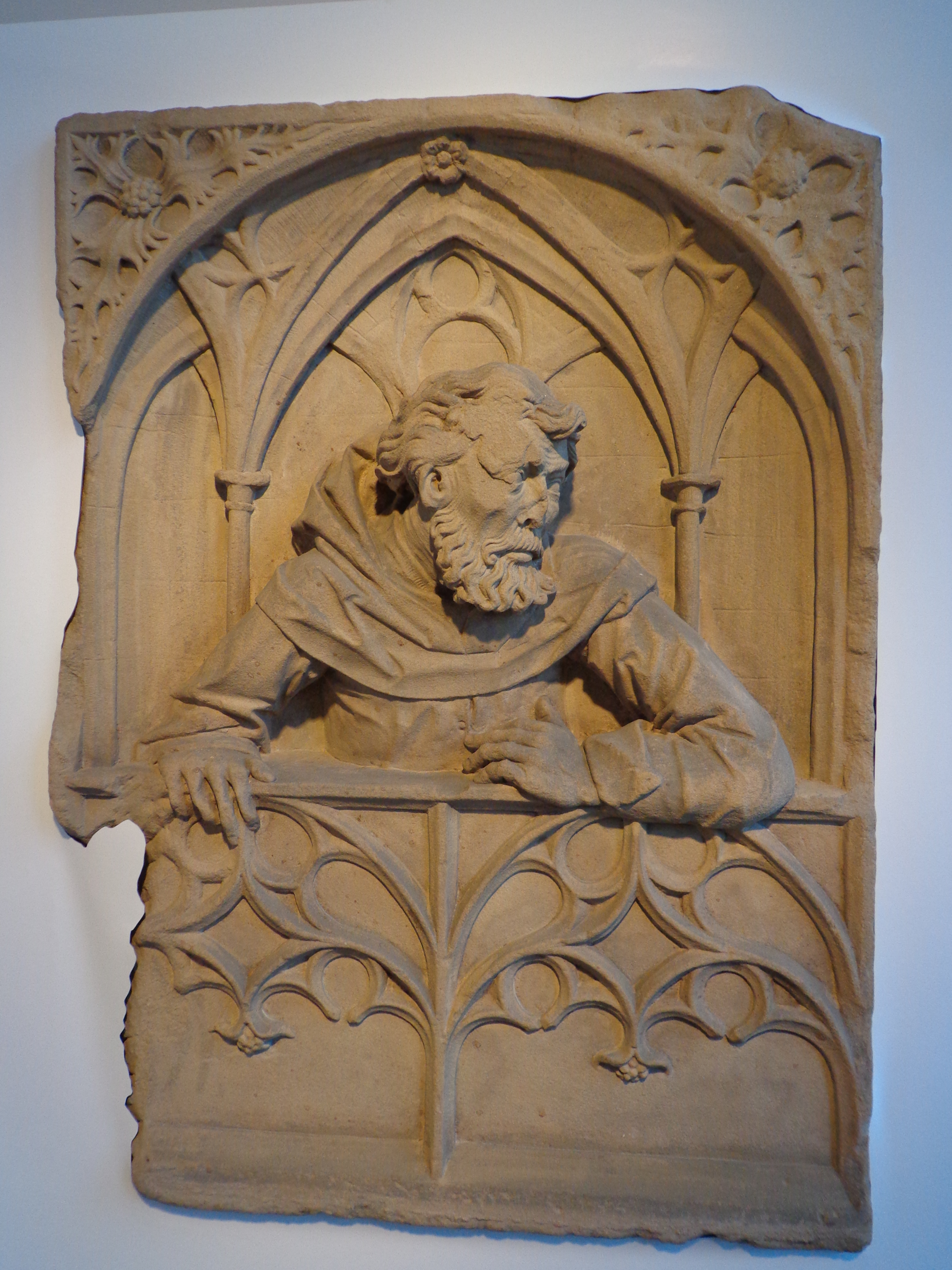
Bust of a man, early 16th-century

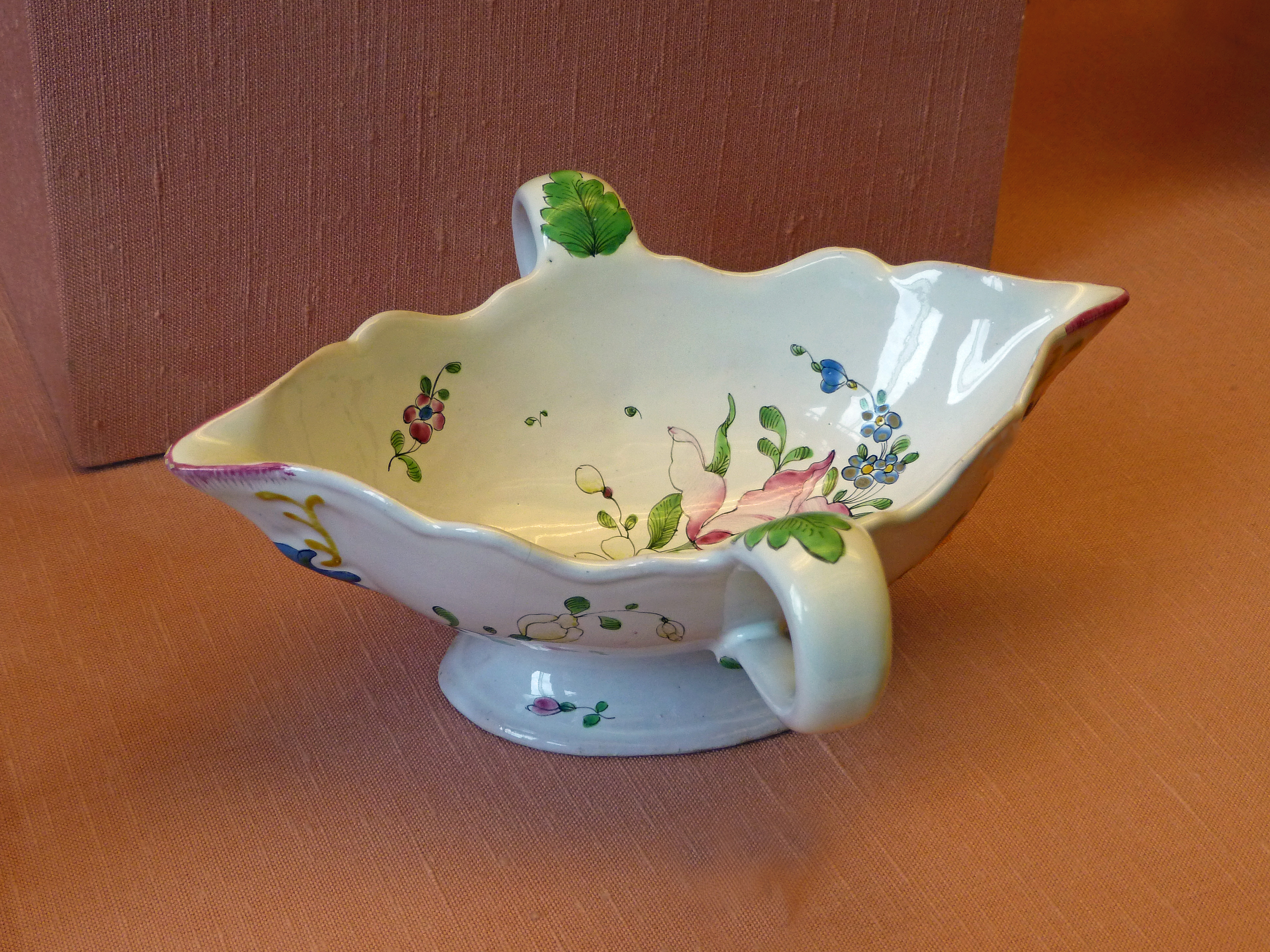
Porcelain by Joseph Hannong, 18th-century

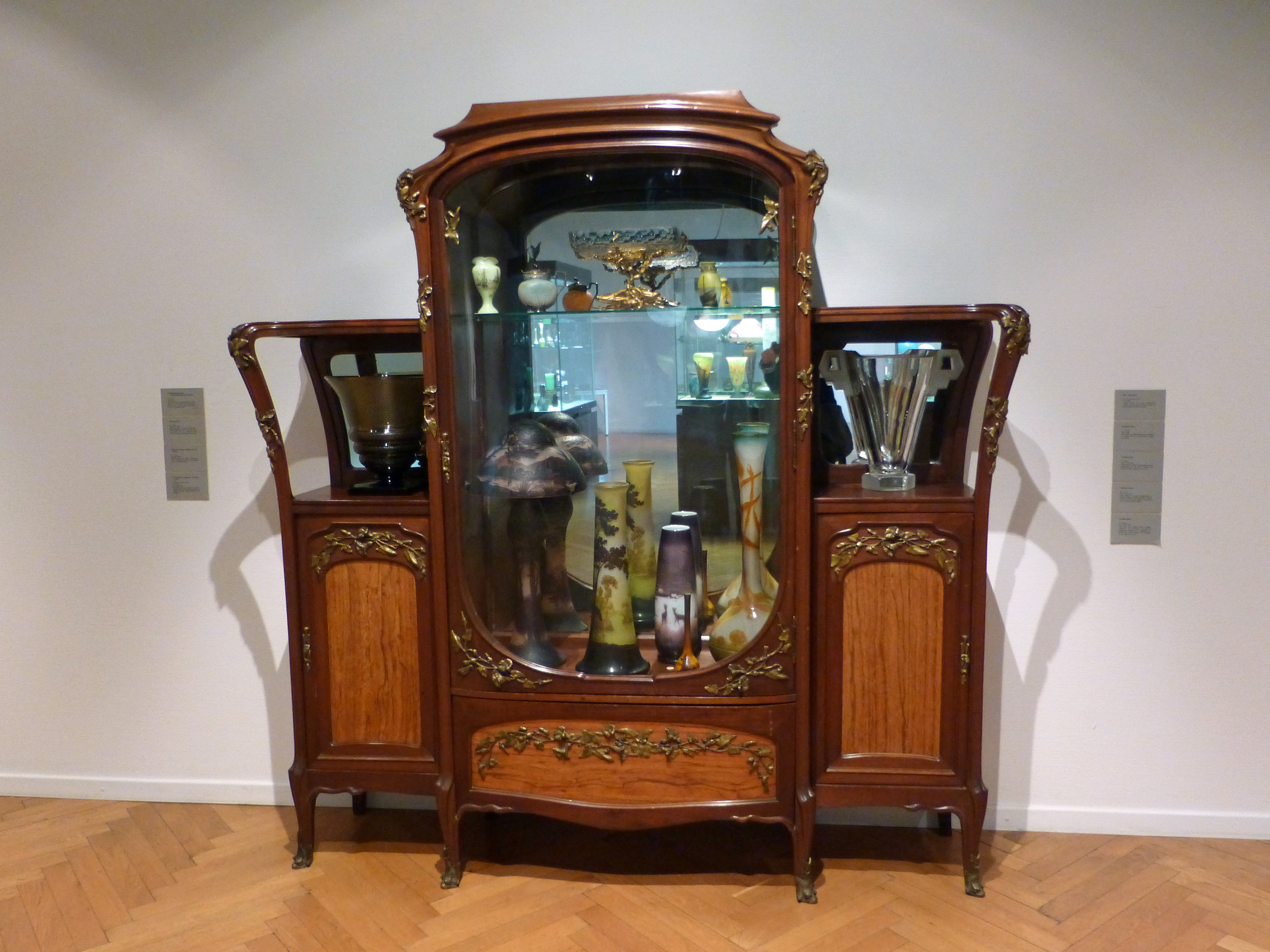
Art Nouveau curio cabinet, early 20th-century
