= Pierre Veilletet =

French journalist and writer

Pierre Veilletet (2 October 1943 – 8 January 2013) was a French journalist and writer.

== Early life and education ==
Pierre Veilletet was born on 2 October 1943 in Momuy (Landes).

== Career ==
From 1968 to 2000, Veilletet worked for the daily French newspaper Sud Ouest, and became their chief reporter in 1973. In 1976 he got France's highest journalism award–the prix Albert-Londres.

He edited the Sunday edition of Sud Ouest from 1979 to 1989, then became editor-in-chief of Sud Ouest until 2000. He also participated in the 1979 launch of a magazine about bullfighting, a subject he was passionate about, Les Cahiers de la corrida.

Veilletet was president of Reporters Without Borders and has been a member of its board of directors since its inception. He was re-elected in 2007 for a two-year term and on September 30, 2009, Dominique Gerbaud was elected to succeed him. Veilletet has published several editorials articles and portraits–including French journalists Bruno Frappat, Claude Imbert, Philippe Tesson, and Denis Jeambar)–in the magazine Médias. In 2008, he was one of the signatories of the "Appel en faveur d’une charte et d’une instance pour l’éthique et la qualité de l’information" (Call for a charter and a body for ethics and quality of information).

He has written several novels, mostly published by Éditions Arléa, which he co-founded along with Catherine and Jean-Claude Guillebaud.

== Other activities ==
In 2003, Veilletet was on the jury of the European Short Film Festival of Bordeaux.

== Death ==
Veilletet died on 8 January 2013.

== Works ==
- 1986: La Pension des nonnes (prix François-Mauriac), Arléa
- 1988: Mari-Barbola (prix Jacques-Chardonne)
- 1989: Bords d’eaux, prix Jean-Jacques-Rousseau
- 1991: Querencia & autres lieux sûrs, Arléa, prix Maurice Genevoix (1992)
- 1992: Plain-chant, pleine page, with Jacques Bertin, Arléa
  - L'Entrepôt Lainé à Bordeaux : Valote et Pistre, photographs by Georges Fessy, Éditions du Demi-cercle
- 1993: Cœur de père, Arléa
- 1996: D’amour et de mort, with Martine Mougin, Aubéron
- 1997: Le vin, leçon de choses, Arléa
- 1998: Mots et merveilles, Arléa
  - Le Cadeau du moine, Arléa
- 2002: Le Prix du sang, Arléa
- 2005: Aficion, photographs by Michel Dieuzaide, Cairn
- 2013: Oui j'ai connu des jours de grâce, Arléa
