= Momuy =

- Commune
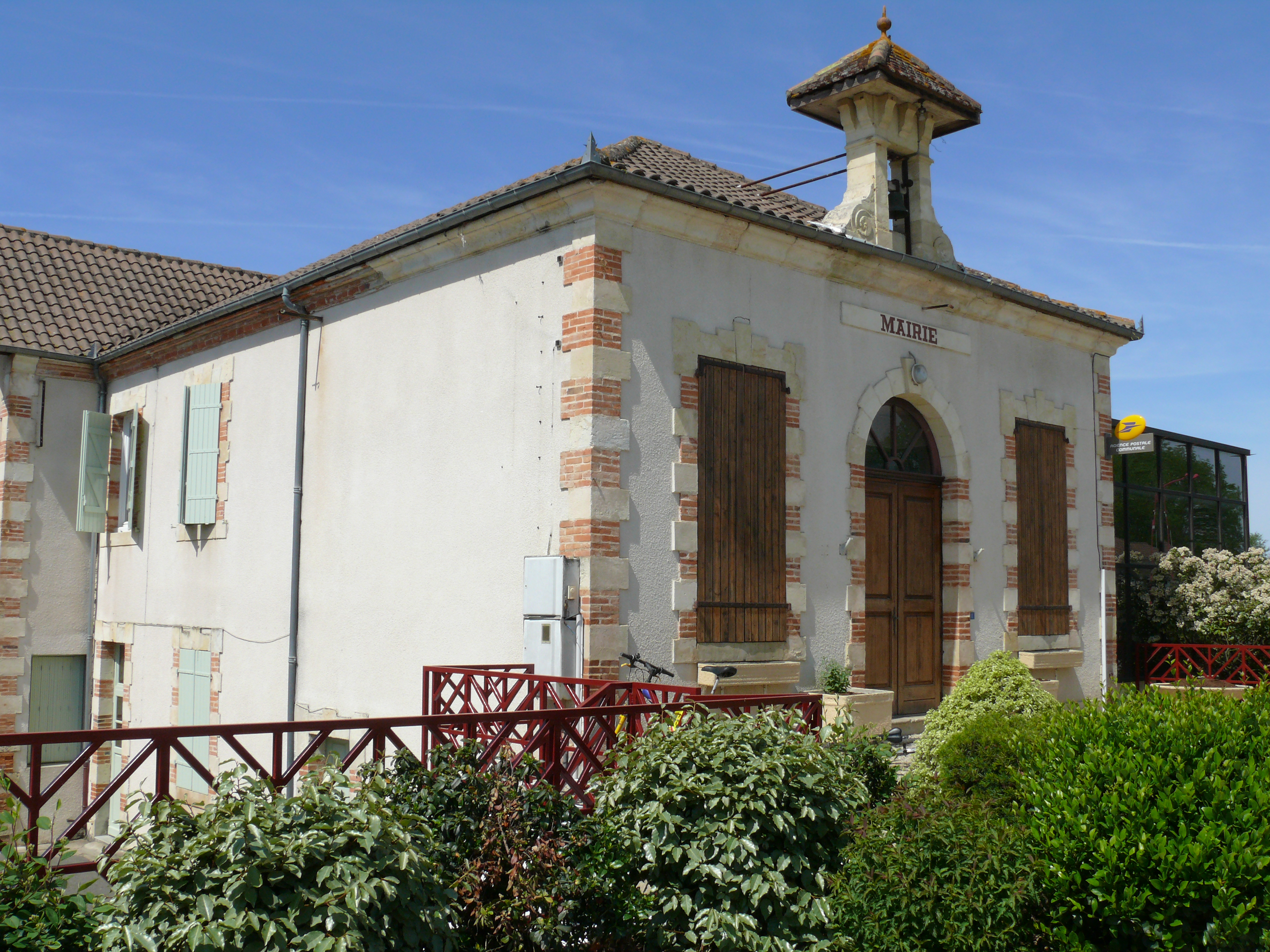
- The town hall in Momuy
- Location of Momuy
- Location within France Location within Nouvelle-Aquitaine
- Coordinates: 43°36′54″N 0°38′04″W
- Country: France
- Region: Nouvelle-Aquitaine
- Department: Landes
- Arrondissement: Mont-de-Marsan
- Canton: Chalosse Tursan
- Intercommunality: Chalosse Tursan

Government
  - Mayor (2020–2026): David Nogues
- Area^{1}: 13.3 km^{2} (5.1 sq mi)
- Elevation: 101 m (331 ft)
- Highest elevation: 126 m (413 ft)
- Lowest elevation: 41 m (135 ft)
- Population (2023): 487
  - Density: 36.6/km^{2} (94.8/sq mi)
- Time zone: UTC+01:00 (CET)
  - Summer (DST): UTC+02:00 (CEST)
- INSEE/Postal code: 40188 /40700
- ^{1} French Land Register data, which excludes lakes, ponds, glaciers > 1 km^{2} (0.386 sq mi or 247 acres) and river estuaries.

Momuy (French pronunciation: [mɔmœj]; Occitan: Momui) is a commune in the Landes department in Nouvelle-Aquitaine in south-western France. The journalist and writer Pierre Veilletet (1943–2013) was born in Momuy.

== See also ==
- Communes of the Landes department
