= Gilles Pudlowski =

French journalist and writer (born 1950)

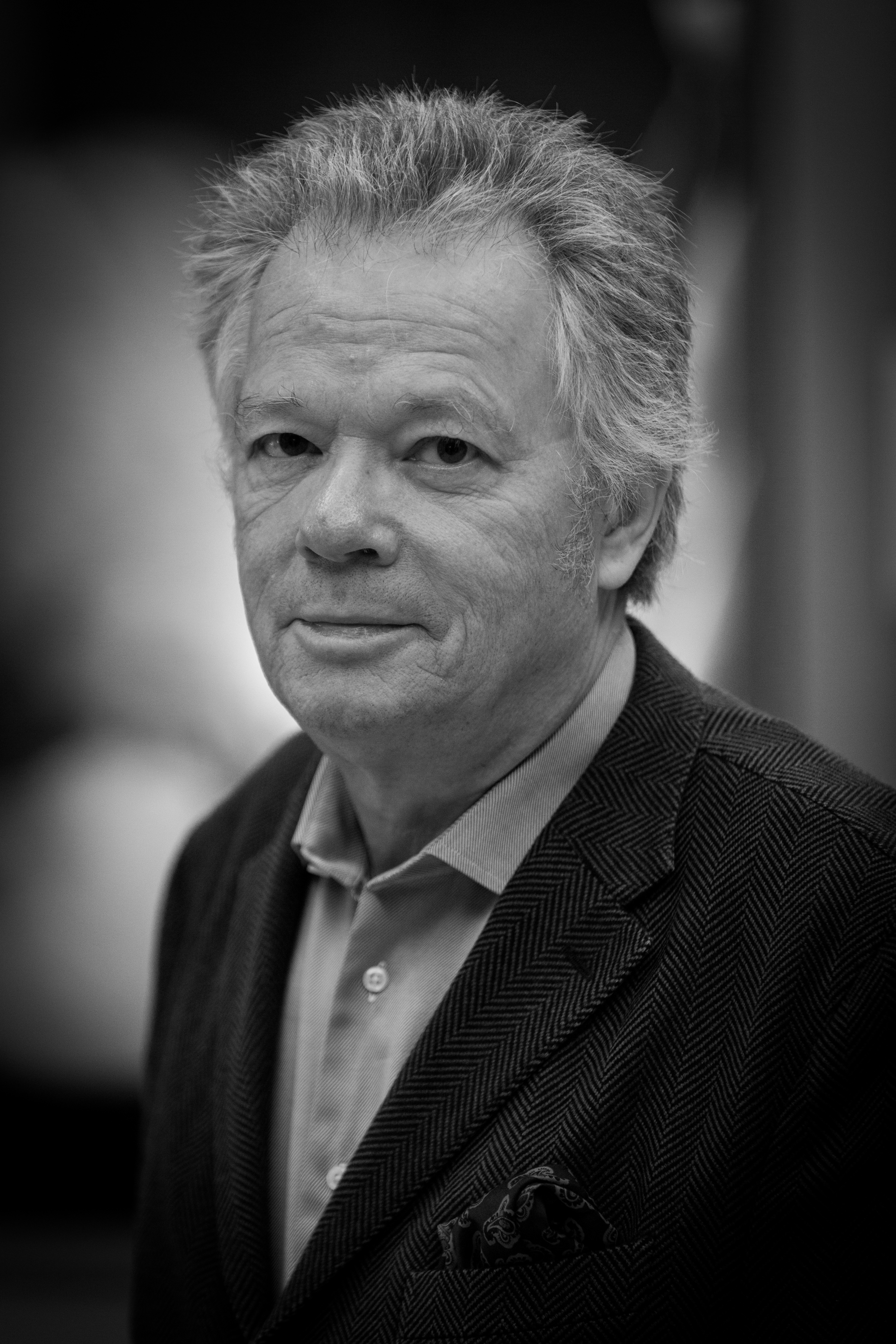
Gilles Pudlowski in April 2016

Gilles Pudlowski (born 15 November 1950 in Metz, Moselle) is a French journalist, writer, literary and gastronomic critic of Polish descent. He writes the blog les Pieds dans le Plat, writes for Saveurs, Cuisine et Vins de France and Les Dernières Nouvelles d'Alsace. He is also the author of the Pudlo guides.

== Biography ==
Gilles Pudlowski was born in Metz, Moselle to a family of Polish immigrants. His grandfather, Józef Pudłowski, was a laborer at Solvay and voted for Polish United Workers' Party. His parents were both born in Poland, his father in Łódź and his mother in Zamość. At the age of nine, in 1959, Gilles began to actively practice Judaism. The day after May 68 Gilles joined New Socialist Party.

After graduating from the Institut d'études politiques de Paris and a history degree, he made his debut at Le Quotidien de Paris founded by Philippe Tesson before joining Les Nouvelles littéraires. Jean-François Kahn, who took up the latter magazine, entrusted him with responsibility for the literary pages and asked him to take charge also of the gastronomic chronicle.

Christian Millau, who spotted him in 1979, offered him to collaborate with the Gault Millau, promising him a career of rigorous criticism in these terms: "In this job, people know how to eat or write, rarely both, sometimes none of the two. If you can do both, you're sure to succeed".

He latter wrote for Paris Match, Cuisine et Vins de France, (where he created the category of "plates", awarding one to three plates to good restaurants, the pot with good quality / price ratio and the broken plate, which will make much of his reputation as "the Zorro of the critique" at the disappointing tables). He has worked with Panorama du Médecin, Parcours, Le Figaro, Cuisine TV, France Inter, Bon Voyage, Air France Madame.

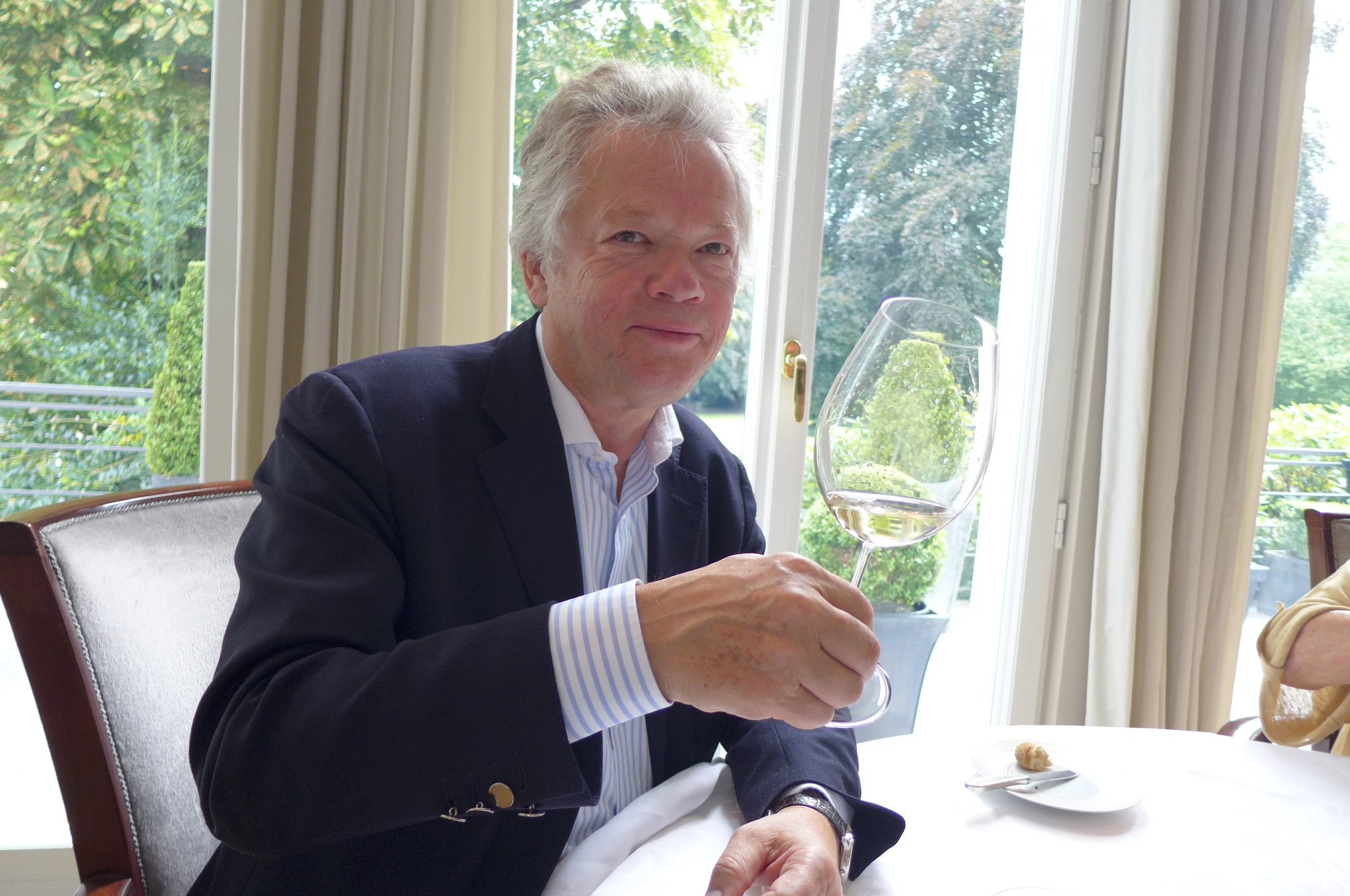
Gilles Pudlowski in 2014.

His reputation is notably linked to the weekly Le Point, of which he was the official columnist from 1986 to 2014. He was a senior reporter and was responsible for the pages of tourism and gastronomy, while actively collaborating on the literary section.

From 1990 to 2016, Gilles Pudlowski gave a weekly column to Les Dernières Nouvelles d'Alsace and, from 1992 to 2015, to Le Républicain lorrain, for, if he is Lorrain by birth, he is an Alsatian at heart.

For the magazines Saveurs et Cuisine et Vins de France, he made major reports on the regions of France and portraits of the chefs in Europe and in the world. He also contributed to the magazine Service Littéraire of François Cérésa. Since 2016, he has been a member of the j ury du prix du premier roman.

After a few piecemeal trials (including several editions of 52-week-ends autour de Paris or le Guide de l’Alsace heureuse, he created, in 1989, his own "global" guide. It is first of all the Pudlowski Guide of the Gourmet Cities (Albin Michel) which obtained the Gutenberg of the practical book in 1990. The Pudlo Paris is published every year from 1990, like the Pudlo France, since 2000, by Michel Lafon.

Gilles Pudlowski has also published "Pudlos" in pocket format devoted to Parisian bistros, Brittany, Alsace, Lorraine, Corsica and Luxembourg. Since 2007, the "Pudlo Paris" and the "Pudlo France" have been published in New York by the Little Book Room, editorial emanation of The New York Review of Books, which also published (in 2008) small Pudlos "Brittany-Normandy", "Alsace" and "Provence Côte d'Azur". The US press sees it as the "best kept secret of French gourmets" and in particular, like the New York Times, that "his plates are more reliable than Michelin stars".

As a confirmed writer, Gilles Pudlowski published autobiographical essays on the theme of attachment to France, such as Devoir de Français, L’Amour du pays (Flammarion), crowned by the Prix Jacques Chardonne and the Prix Maurice Genevoix, but also Les Chemins de la Douce France (Plon) as well as a novel, Le Voyage de Clémence (Flammarion, 1987) and Le Dictionnaire amoureux de l'Alsace (Plon).

He is also responsible for the preface of the Larousse gastronomique (2007), literary anthologies (L'Année Poétique, Le Goût de Strasbourg), art books (Les Grandes gueules, Elles sont chefs, Les Trésors gourmands de la France, France Bistrots, Les Plus belles tables de France), As well as a handbook of good manners: Comment être critique gastronomique et garder la ligne, which he will update a few years later with À quoi sert vraiment un critique gastronomique, which became the reference work on this domain.

Pudlowski won the prize La Mazille for lifetime achievement at the gourmet festival Périgueux in 1992 and the price Amunátegui – Curnonsky, awarded by the Association professionnelle des chroniqueurs et informateurs de la gastronomie et du vin (Professional Association of chroniclers and informants Gastronomy and wine]), in December 2008.

Pudlowski was awarded the second Prix des Écrivains gastronomes on 7 March 2015 for Le Tour de France Gourmand at Éditions du Chêne.

His blog Les Pieds dans le plat, obtained La Gastronomie Numérique award at "Gastronomades 2015".

== Distinctions ==
- 1986: Chevalier des Arts et des Lettres
- 1996: Chevalier du Order of Agricultural Merit
- 2009: Chevalier of the National Order of Merit

== Bibliography ==
Éditions Michel Lafon

- Le Pudlo France, 2000, 2001, 2002, 2003, 2005, 2006, 2007, 2008, 2009
- Le Pudlo Paris, 1999, 2000, 2001, 2002, 2003, 2004, 2005, 2006, 2007, 2008, 2009, 2010, 2011, 2012, 2013, 2014, 2015
- Le Pudlo Paris des Bistrots et Brasseries, 2007, 2009, 2010
- Le Pudlo Week-Ends, 2000
- Le Pudlo Corse, 2004, 2005
- Le Pudlo Bretagne, 2005, 2008, 2009, 2010
- Le Pudlo Alsace, 2007, 2009, 2011, 2012, 2013, 2014, 2015
- Le Pudlo Lorraine, 2007, 2009
- Le Pudlo Luxembourg, 2007

Flammarion

- Le Devoir de Français, narrative, 1984.
- L'Amour du Pays, narrative, 1986 (prix Maurice Genevoix, prix Jacques Chardonne).
- Le Voyage de Clémence, novel, 1987.
- Elles sont chefs (photos by Maurice Rougemont), 2005.
- Les plus belles tables de France (photos by Maurice Rougemont), 2011.

J'ai Lu

- Le Devoir de Français (2012)

Armand Colin

- À quoi sert vraiment un critique gastronomique?, 2011

Éditions de la Martinière

- France Bistrots (photos by Maurice Rougemont) 2012.
- Les Grandes Tables de Paris (photos by Maurice Rougemont) 2013

Éditions du Chêne

- Le Crocodile de Philippe Bohrer (photos by Maurice Rougemont) 2012.
- Le Tour de France Gourmand (photos by Maurice Rougemont) 2014, Prix des Ecrivains gastronomes 2015
- La Maison Kammerzell (photos by Maurice Rougemont) 2014

Glénat Editions

- Les Grandes Gueules et leurs recettes (photos de Maurice Rougemont) 2009.

Mercure de France

- Le Goût de Strasbourg, 2006

Éditions Athéo

- Le Pudlo Alsace-Lorraine, 2004

Mazarine/Fayard

- Le Pudlo de Paris Gourmand, 1998.

Ramsay/Michel Lafon

- Le Pudlo de Paris Gourmand, 1995, 1996, 1997.

Éditions Jean-Paul Schortgen

- Le Pudlo Luxembourg, 2002, 2005.

Éditions de la Renaissance du Livre

- Les Trésors Gourmands de la France (photos by Maurice Rougemont), 1997.

Éditions du Rocher

- Comment être critique gastronomique et garder la ligne, 2004
- Le Devoir de Français, récit 2003

Robert Laffont

- Saveurs des Terroirs de France, avec les sœurs Scotto, 1991.

Plon

- Le Dictionnaire Amoureux de l'Alsace, 2010 ISBN 978-2-259-20947-2
- Les Chemins de la Douce France, récit, 1996.

Albin Michel

- 52-week-ends autour de Paris, 1983, 1985, 1987, 1990, 1993.
- 52-week-ends en France, en collaboration, 1986.
- La Jeune Cuisine d'Alsace, 1986.
- Le Guide Pudlowski de l'Alsace Gourmande, 1988, 1989, 1992, 1995.
- Le Guide Pudlowski des Villes Gourmandes, 1989 (Gutenberg du livre pratique 1990).
- Le Guide Pudlowski de Paris gourmand, 1990, 1991.
- 52-week-ends dans les Relais et Châteaux, 1991, 1994.

Argentoratum

- Le Pudlo Alsace de l’an 2000, 1999

Bueb et Reumaux

- Le Guide de l'Alsace heureuse, 1985.

Éditions Saint-Germain-des-Prés

- Litanie du Blues, 1974
- Jean Poperen et l'UGCS, du PSU au Parti socialiste, itinéraire d'un courant politique, 1975

François Bourin

- Je vous écris de Strasbourg, 1988.

Poche-DNA/Éditions de la Nuée bleue

- Guide de Strasbourg gourmand, 1993
- Winstubs d'Alsace, 1994, 1996.
- Paris für Feinschmecker, 1994 (in German).
- Lorraine gourmande, 1996.

JC Lattès

- Le Guide Pudlowski de Paris Gourmand, 1992 (prix la Mazille), 1993, 1994.

Éditions Seghers

- L'Année poétique 77, anthology, 1978.

Hologrammes

- Paris, fête gourmande, 1990

Éditions Ouest-France

- Bretagne Nouvelle Vague (photos by Jean-Daniel Sudres), 2012
- Alsace Nouvelle Vague (photos by Maurice Rougemont), 2013
- Alsace Tradition (photos by Maurice Rougemont), 2013

A Little Book Room (New York)

- Pudlo Paris 2007–2008, ISBN 978-1-892145-48-2
- Pudlo France 2008–2009, ISBN 978-1892145-51-2
- Pudlo Normandy & Brittany 2008–2009, ISBN 978-1892145-62-8
- Pudlo Alsace 2008–2009, ISBN 978-1892145-61-1
- Pudlo Provence, the Côte-d’Azur & Monaco 2008–2009, ISBN 978-1892145-60-4

Éditions Alexandrines

- L’Alsace des écrivains, 2016. ISBN 9782370890252

Éditions Gründ/Plon Le Dictionnaire Amoureux illustré de l'Alsace, 2016

Éditions Steinkis/Incipit Dans la tête de Pierre H, 2016
