= Louis Nucéra =

French writer (1928–2000)

- Born: 18 July 1928; Nice
- Died: 9 August 2000 (aged 72); Carros
- Occupation: Writer

Louis Nucéra (17 July 1928 – 9 August 2000) was an award-winning 20th-century French writer. He published his first novel L'obstiné in 1970.

== Biography ==
Je suis venu au monde à l'ombre précaire d'une bicyclette suspendue entre ciel et terre.
[I came into the world in the precarious shadow of a bicycle suspended between heaven and earth]

— Louis Nucéra in the dedication of Mes rayons de soleil

As well as being a writer, Nucéra was a cyclist (he rode the same circuit as the 1949 Tour de France), a bank clerk, a journalist, a press secretary in a record company, and a literary director at JC Lattès. He recalls his childhood in Nice in Avenue des Diables bleus. In 1991 he wrote Le ruban rouge which chronicles the life of Italian immigrants. In Mes ports d’attache he evokes his friendships with Cioran, Kessel, Picasso, Cocteau, Hardellet, Brassens and Moretti.

Nucéra died on August 9, 2000, in the industrial zone of Carros when he was hit by a car while bike riding.

== Awards ==
- 1981: Prix Interallié for Le Chemin de la Lanterne
- 1991: Prix Jacques-Chardonne for Le ruban rouge
- 1993: Grand prix de littérature de l'Académie française for the whole of his work

== Works ==
- 1970: L'obstiné
- 1971: Le greffier
- 1973: Cocteau - Moretti, l'âge du verseau
- 1973: Les chats « Il n'y a pas de quoi fouetter un homme »
- 1974: L'Ami
- 1975: Dora, dans l'enfer du camp de concentration où les savants nazis préparaient la conquête de l'espace
- 1977: La Kermesse aux idoles
- 1979: Avenue des Diables-Bleus
- 1980: Les Roues de la fortune
- 1981: Le Chemin de la Lanterne, Éditions Grasset, Prix Interallié
- 1983: Entre chien et chat
- 1984: Le kiosque à musique
- 1987: Mes rayons de soleil
- 1989: La chanson de Maria
- 1990: Principauté de Monaco
- 1991: Le ruban rouge, Prix Jacques-Chardonne
- 1994: Mes ports d'attache
- 1997: Le roi René
- 1994: Villages perchés de Provence et de la Riviera
- 1998: Ils s'aimaient
- 1998: Parc national du Mercantour. Montagnes du soleil, with Christine Michiels and Bertrand Bodin
- 2000: Une Bouffée d'air frais
- 2000: Saint-Malo, le rêve breton d'une enfance niçoise
- 2001: Les contes du lapin agile (posthumous)
- 2001: Brassens, délit d'amitié, presented and foreworded by Bernard Morlino, (posthumous)
- 2001: Les Chats de Paris, with Joseph Delteil, (posthumous)
- 2001: Sa majesté le chat, (posthumous)
- 2008: Le goût de Nice, with Jacques Barozzi, and Max Gallo, (posthumous)
- 2010: Ils ont éclairé mon chemin, an anthology of literary critics brought together and presented by Bernard Morlino.
