= Musée alsacien (Haguenau) =

Museum in Haguenau, France

Musée alsacien de Haguenau
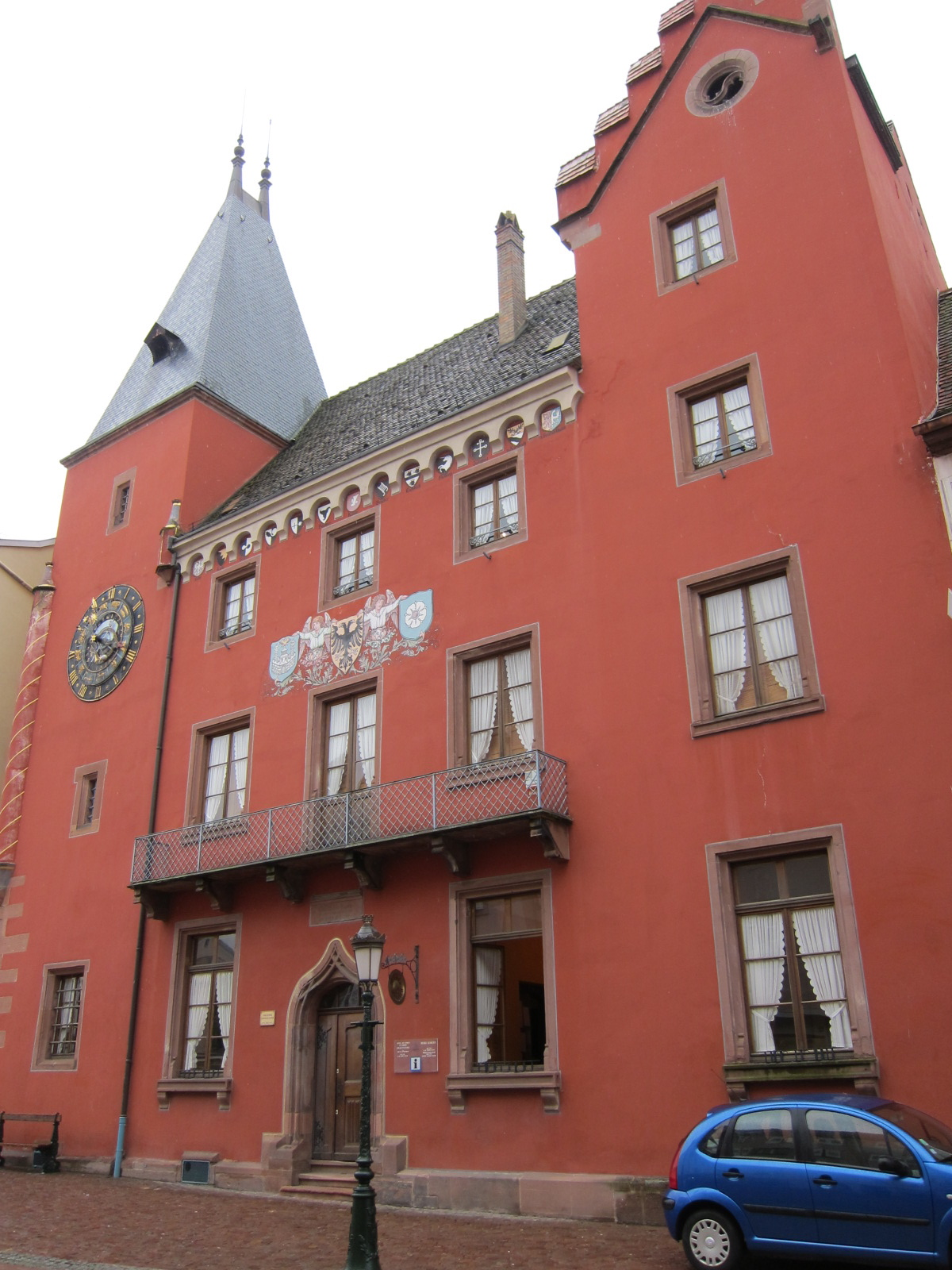
- Façade of the museum in February 2010
- Established: 1972
- Location: 1 Place Joseph Thierry, 67500 Haguenau, France
- Coordinates: 48°48′53″N 7°47′21″E
- Type: Ethnography; Folk art
- Public transit access: Bus Ritmo lines 1 and 2, stop Ancienne Douane
- Website: www.ville-haguenau.fr/musee-alsacien

The Museé alsacien (Alsatian museum) is one of the three museums of Haguenau, France. Like its older and much larger counterpart in Strasbourg, it is dedicated to local, mostly rural customs, furniture, and folk art.

The museum was established in 1972 when the ethnographic collection of the Musée historique de Haguenau was separated from the rest of the collections to reorganise the existing space. It was moved into the former chancery (French: chancellerie), a late 15th-century building.

== Building ==
The museum has been installed since 1972 in the old medieval chancellery, which was built around 1486 and had this function until 1790. The building was partially restored during the 19th century.

The burgundy facade is of great architectural interest. The arms and the seal of the city, the coat of arms of the Empire and the coats of arms of patricians and notables of the city are symbolized on the facade.

Manufactured in 1904 by the firm Hörz and remained in the city's historical museum until 1958, the astronomical clock is a replica of Ulm's Town Hall made in the 16th century by Isaac Habrecht. The clock has an astrolabe and a planetary, which reproduces the movements of the stars and stars around the Sun; the dial has a diameter of 2.76 meters.

== Collection ==
The collections are spread over two floors, in addition to the ground floor, which is mainly devoted to reception. It has Alsatian costumes worn from the 17th century, paintings under glass, religious or popular images, canivets, regional furniture and ceramics as well as the reconstruction of a traditional interior.

== Gallery ==
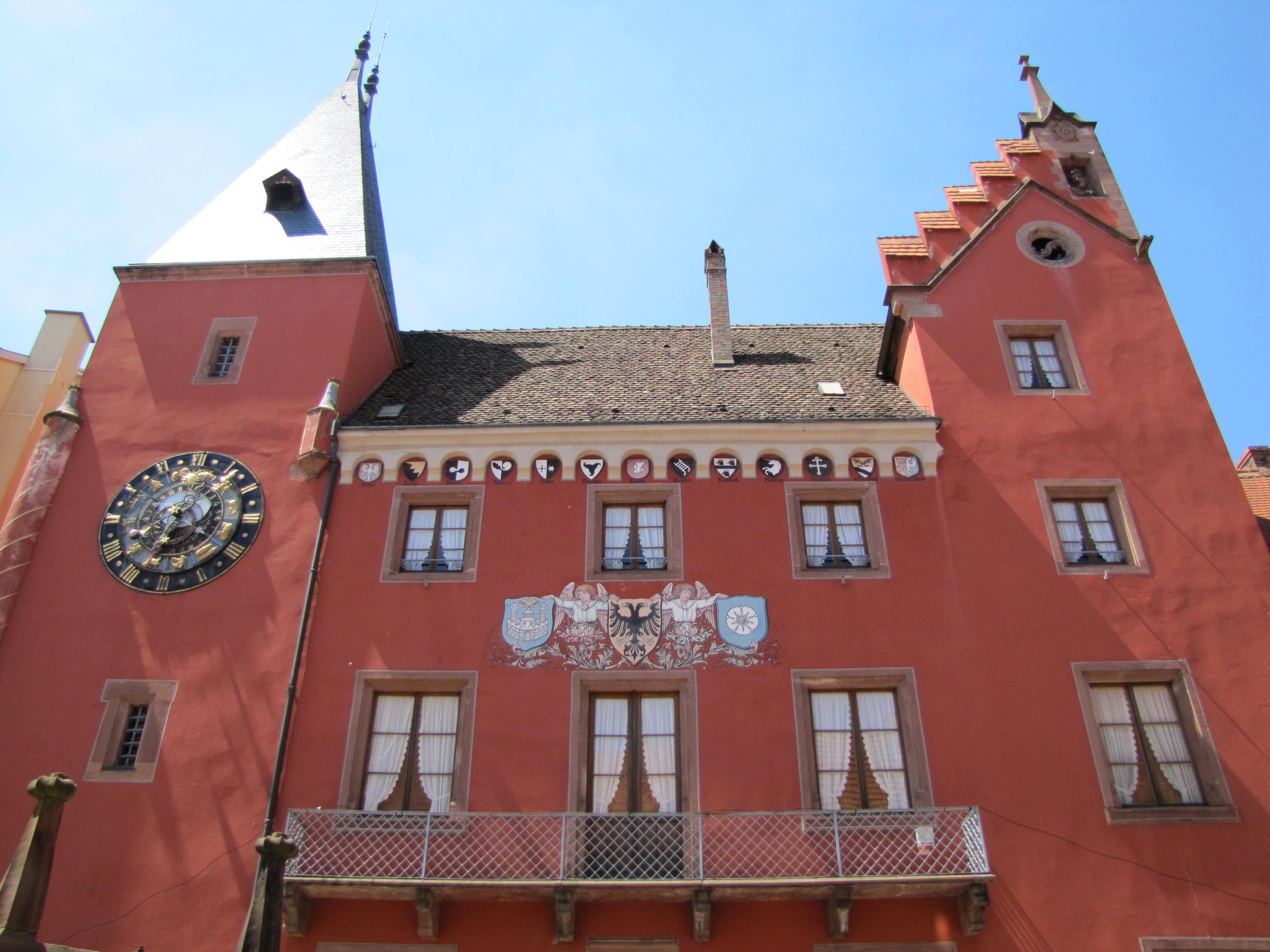
Upper part of the façade

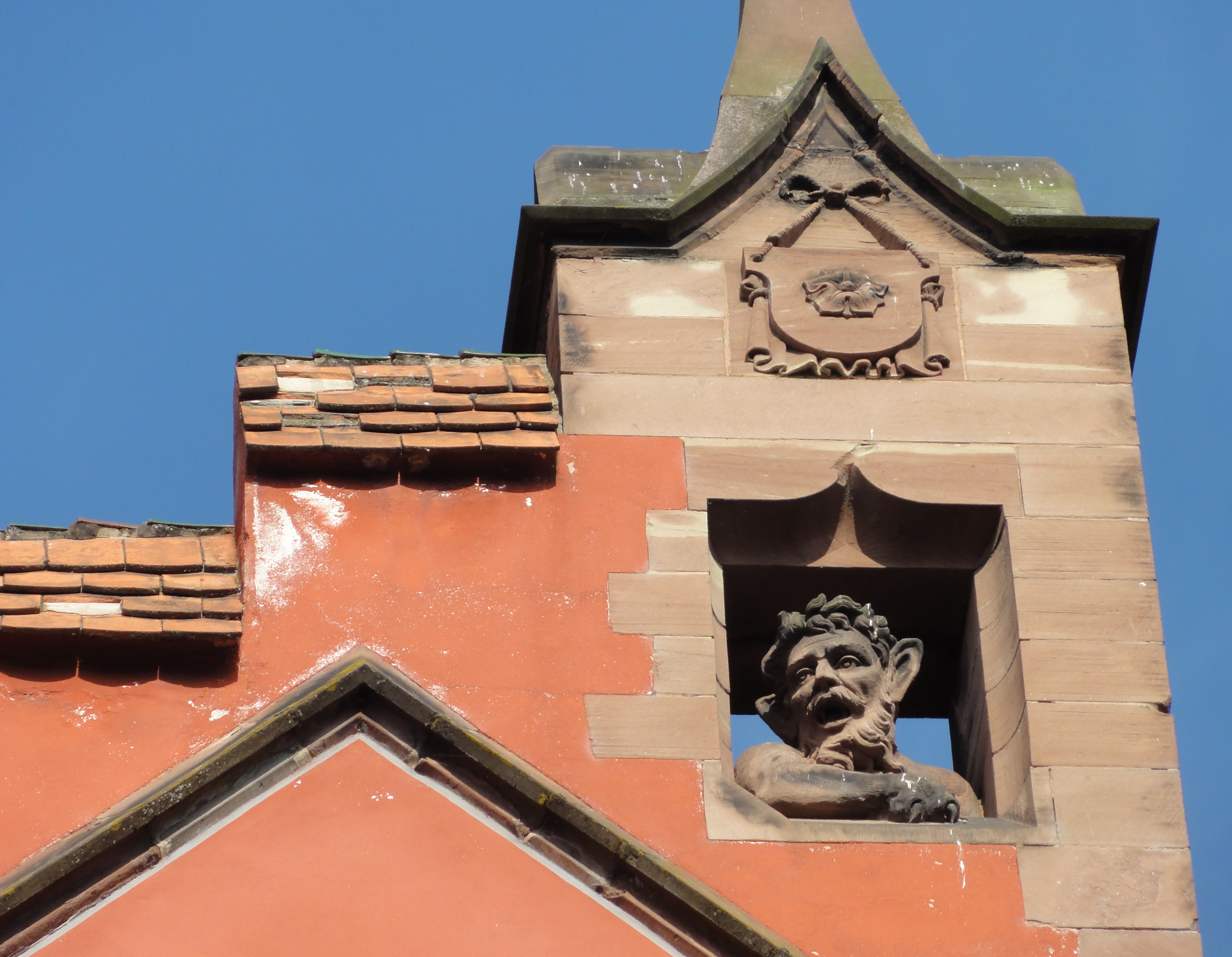
Detail of the façade

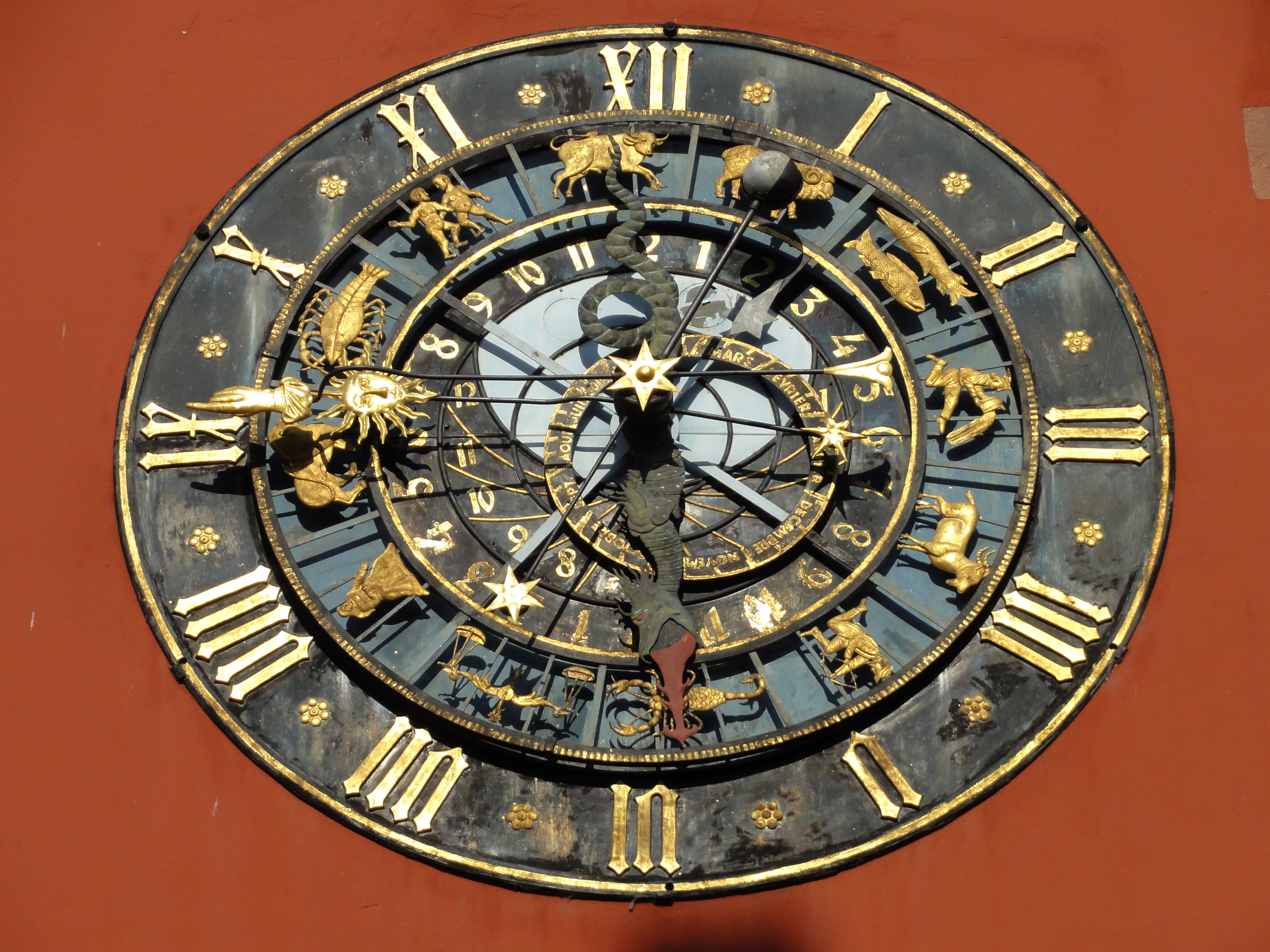
Astronomical clock on the façade

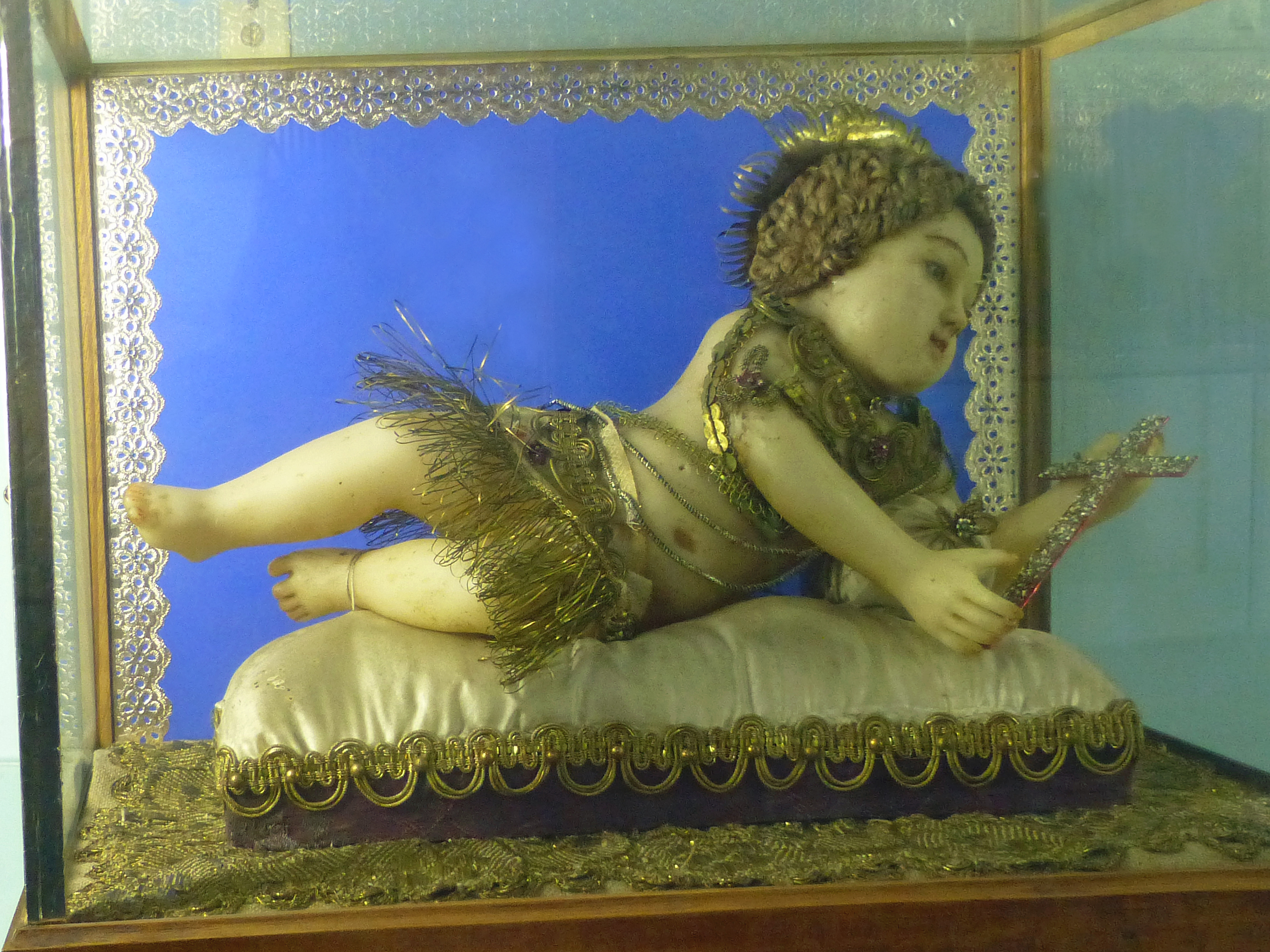
Wax statuette of Infant Jesus (19th century)

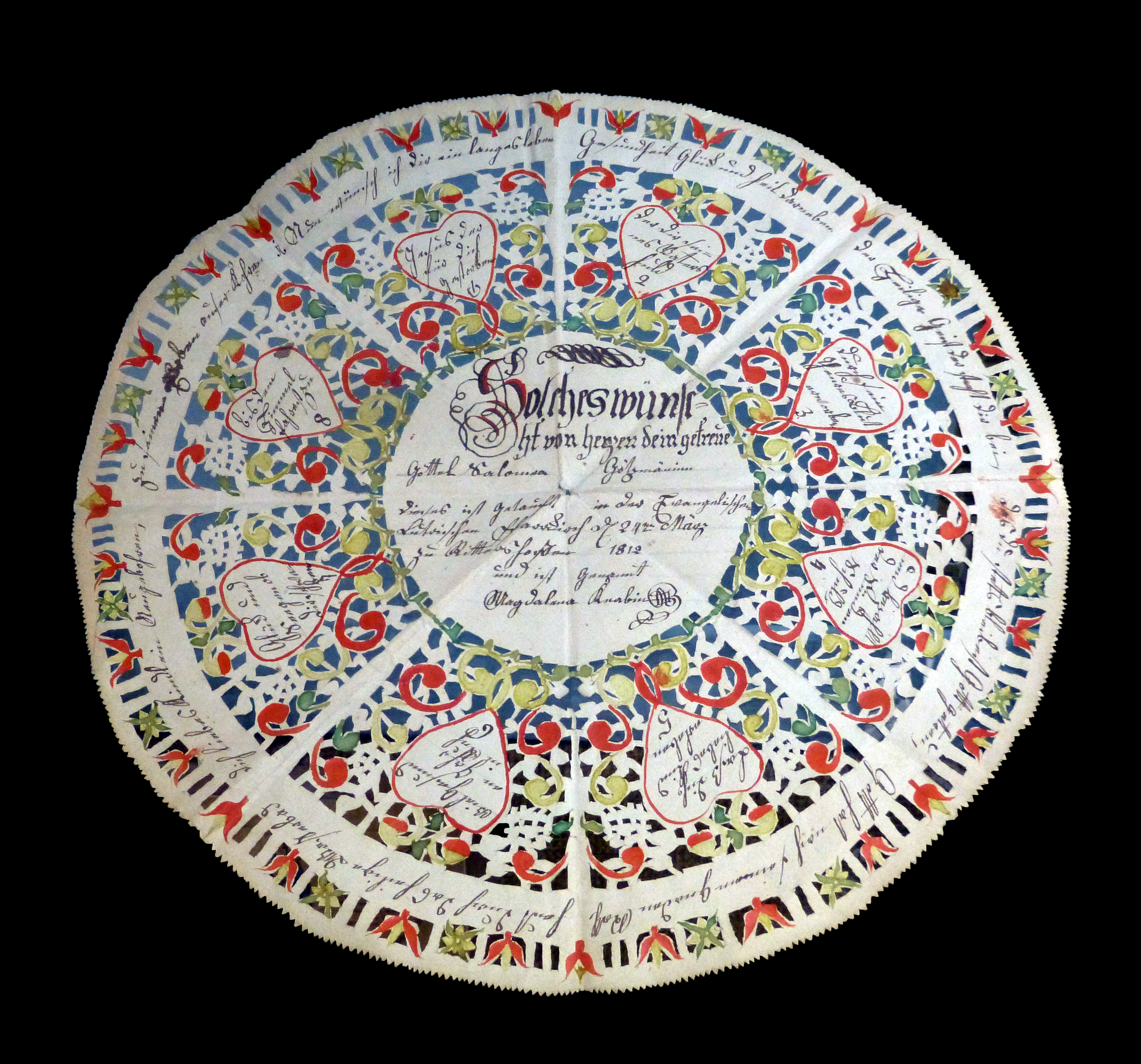
Baptism wishes (1812)

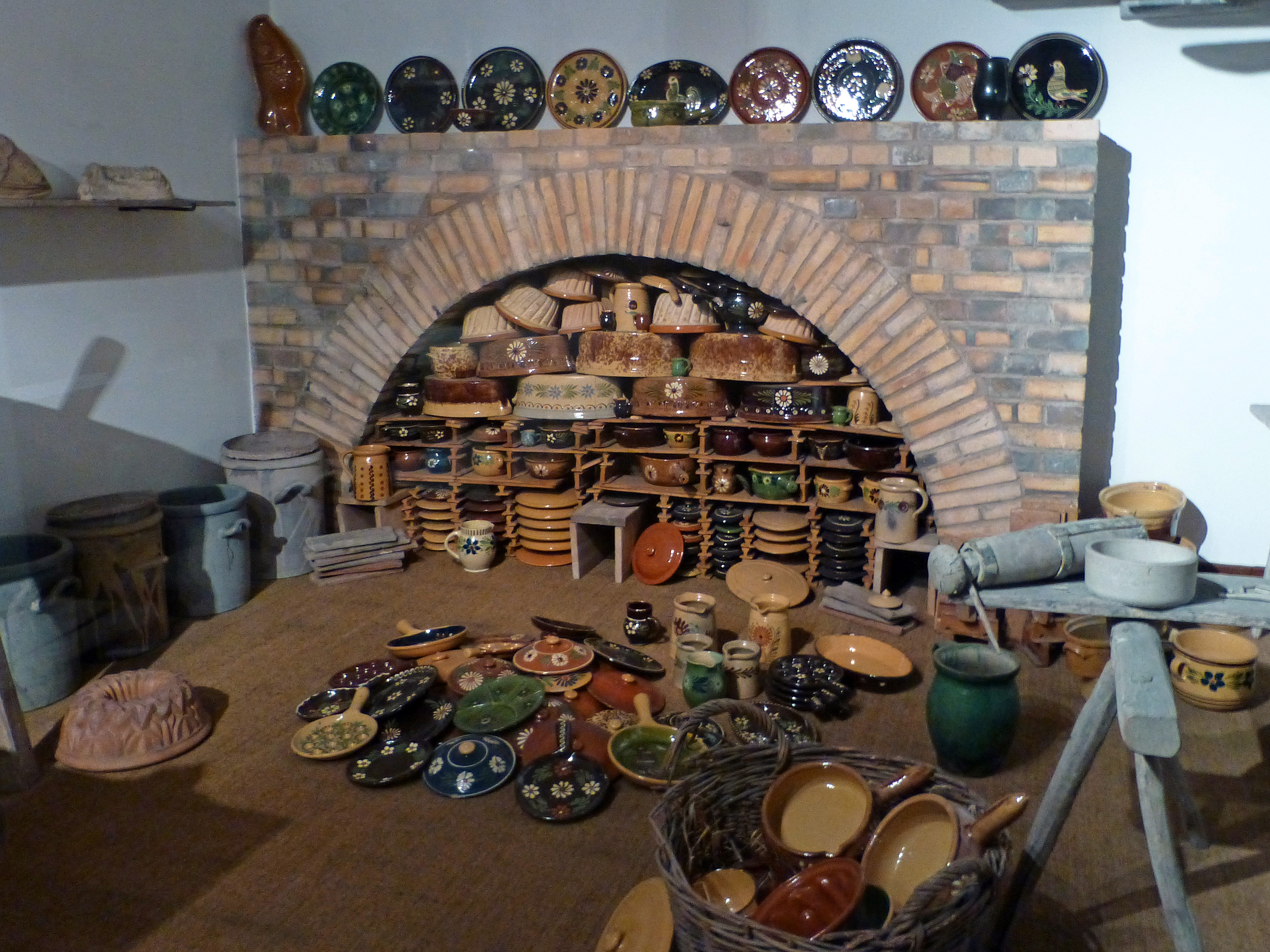
Pottery from Soufflenheim

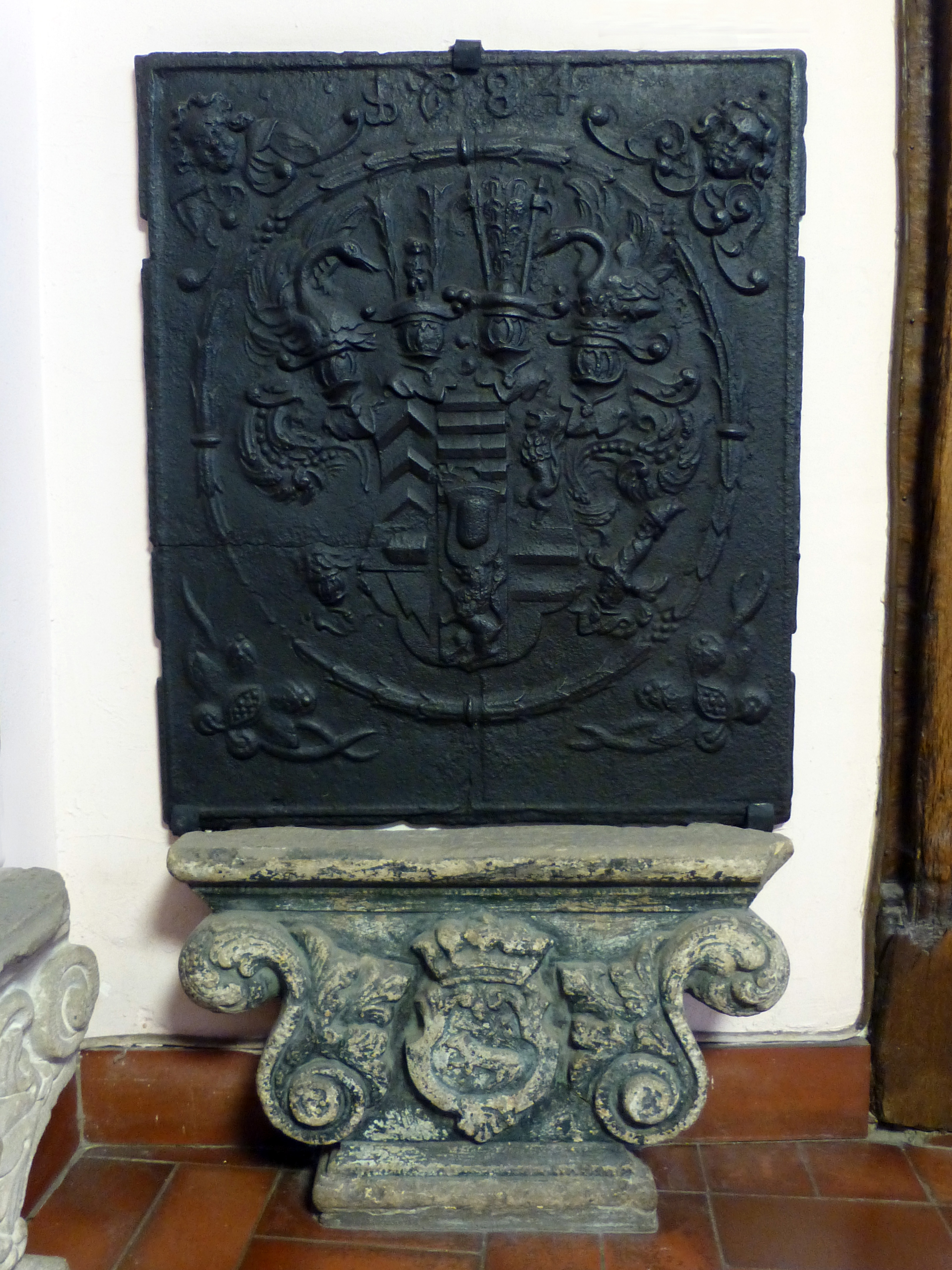
Fireplace fireback (1684) with coat of arms of the Counts of Hanau-Lichtenberg

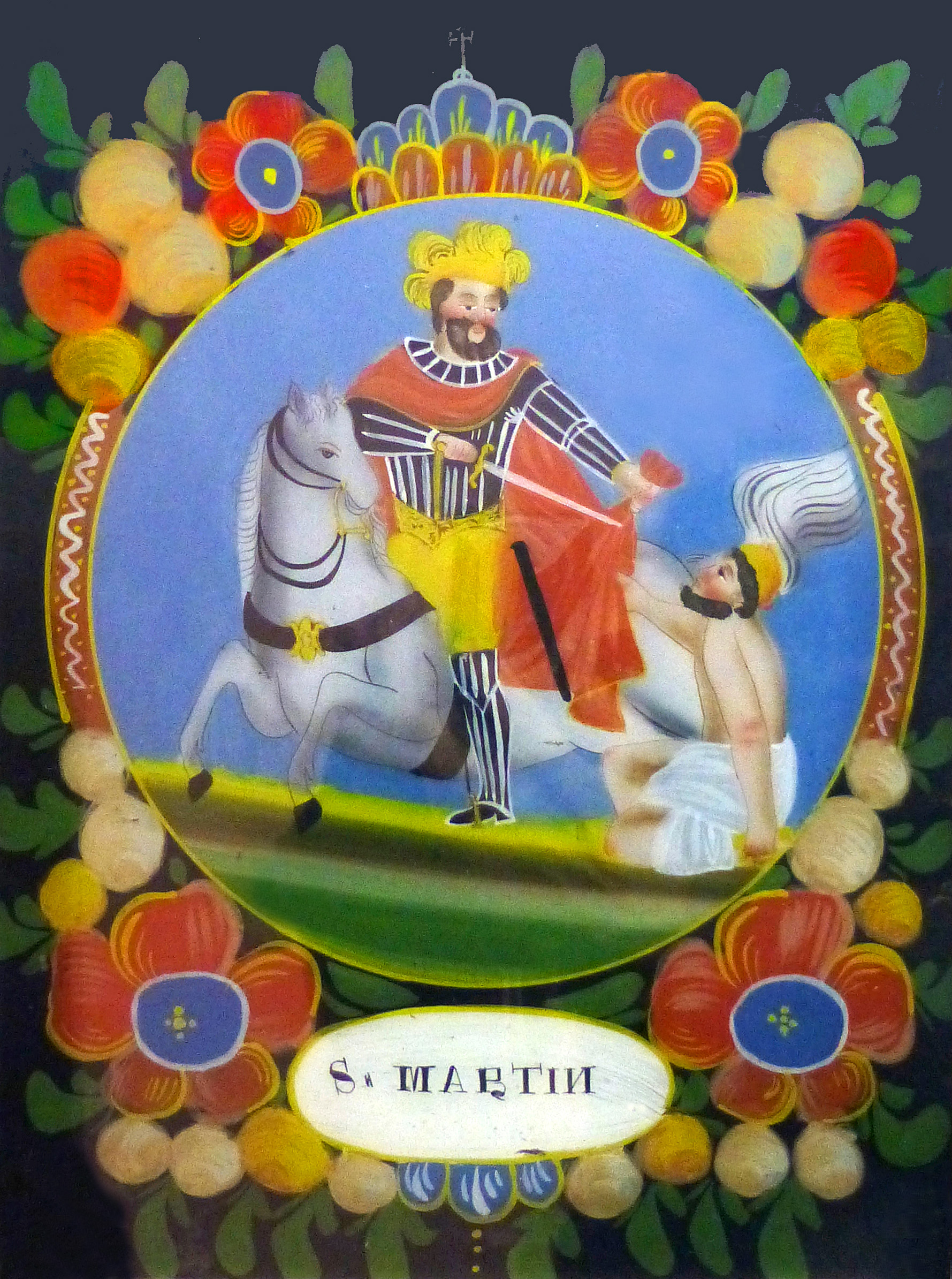
Reverse glass painting (18th century) of St Martin and the beggar

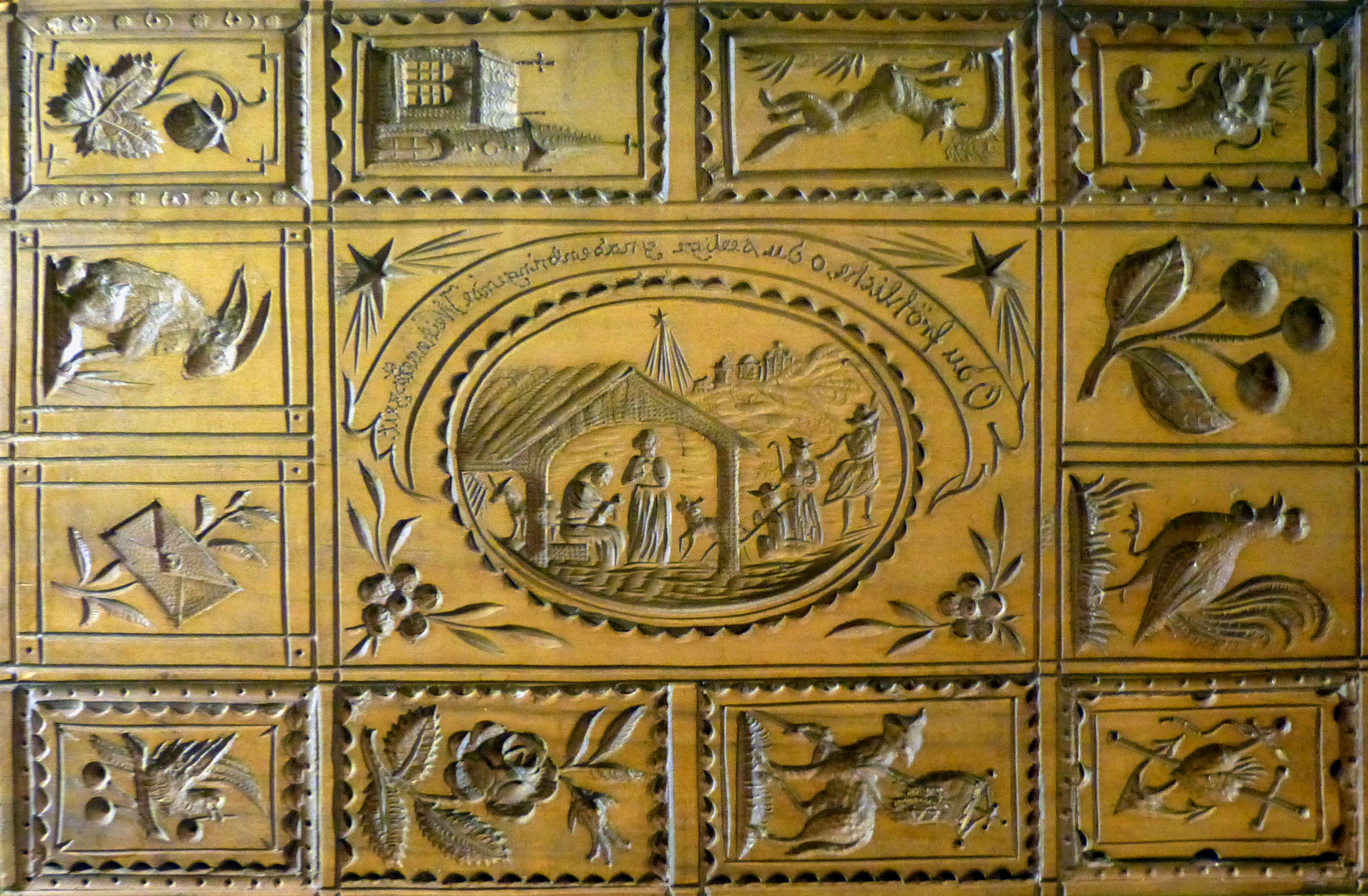
Mould for Springerle cookies

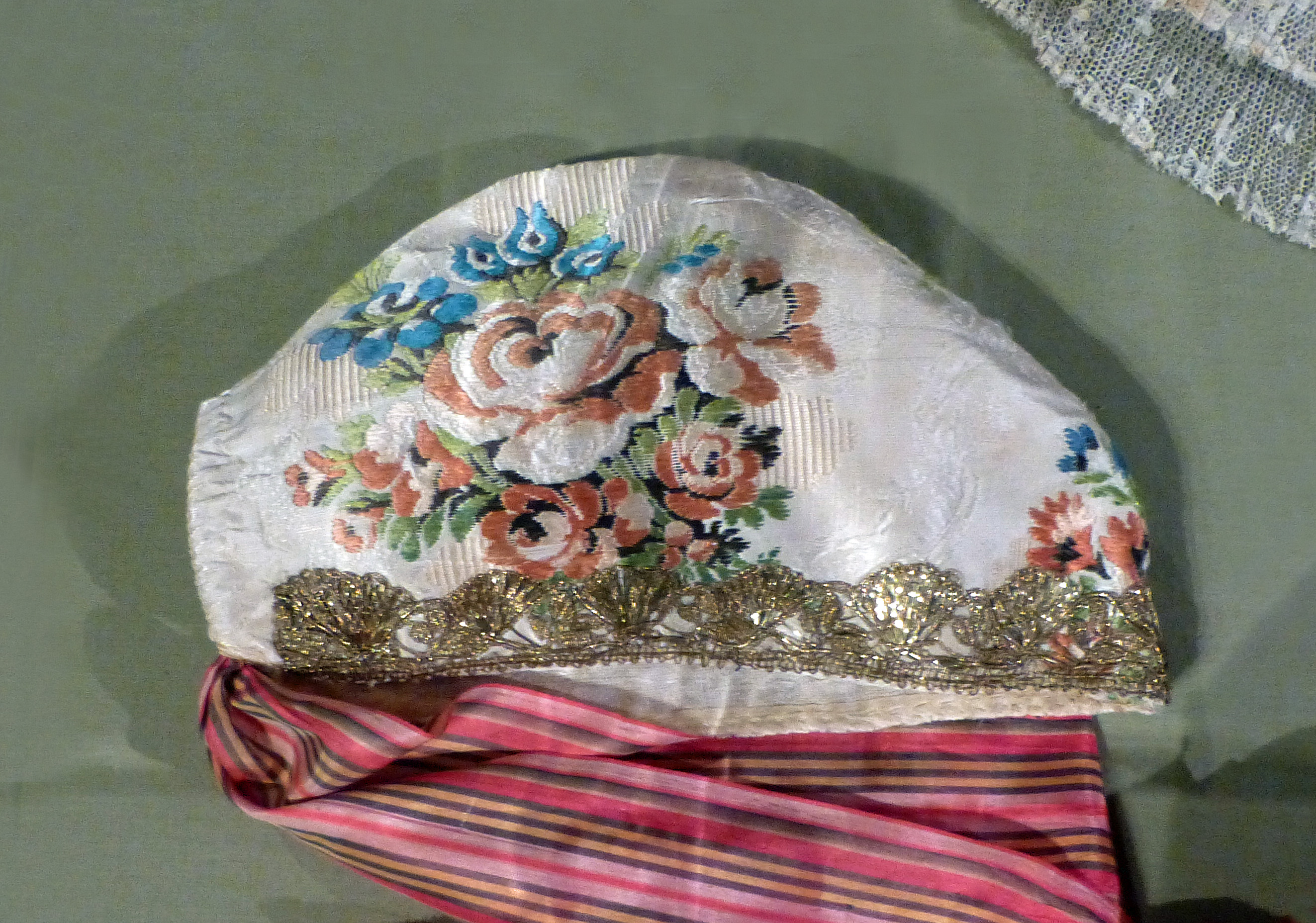
Embroidered cap (early 19th century)
