= Musée alsacien (Strasbourg) =

Museum in France

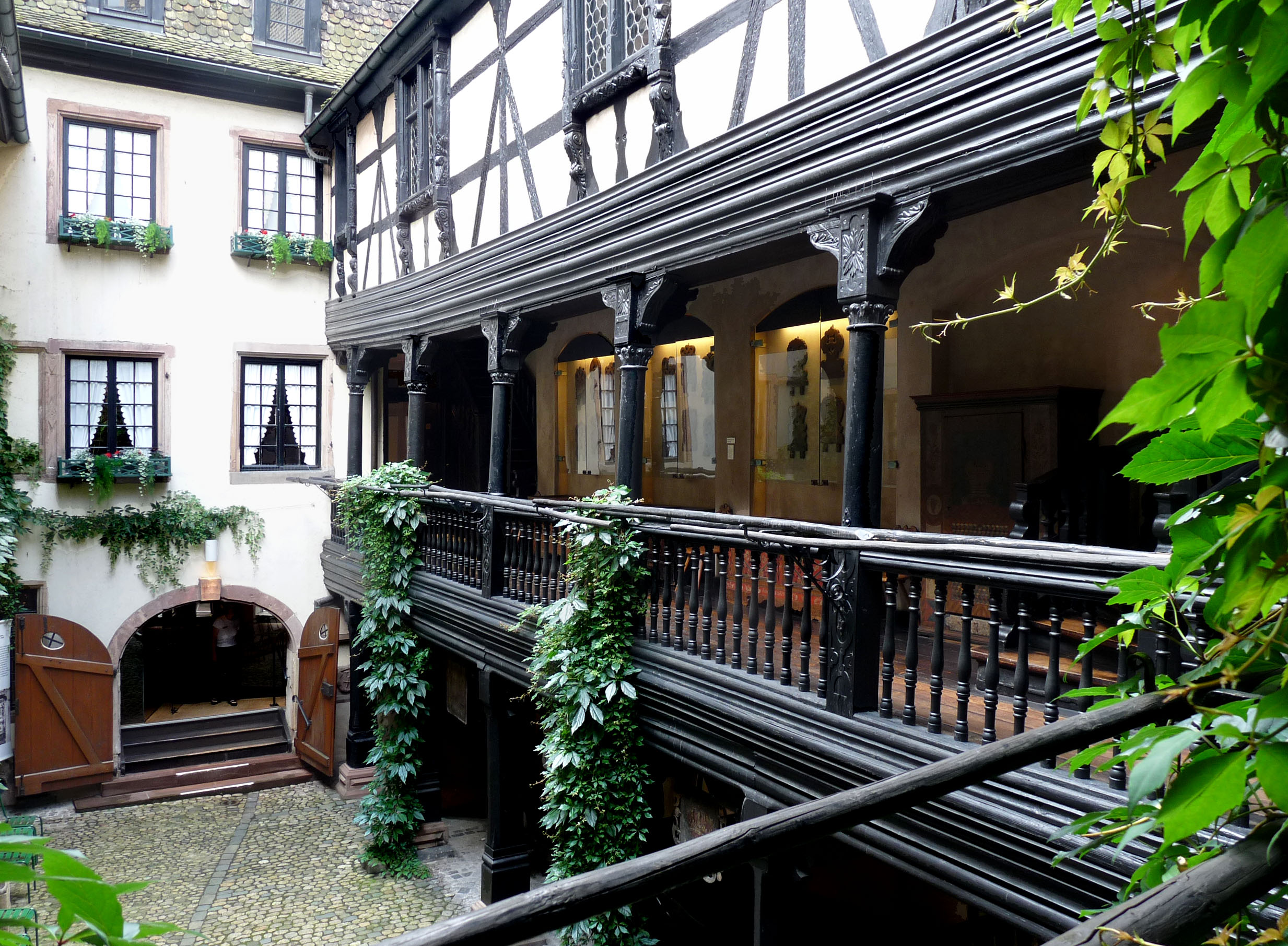
- Courtyard of the museum

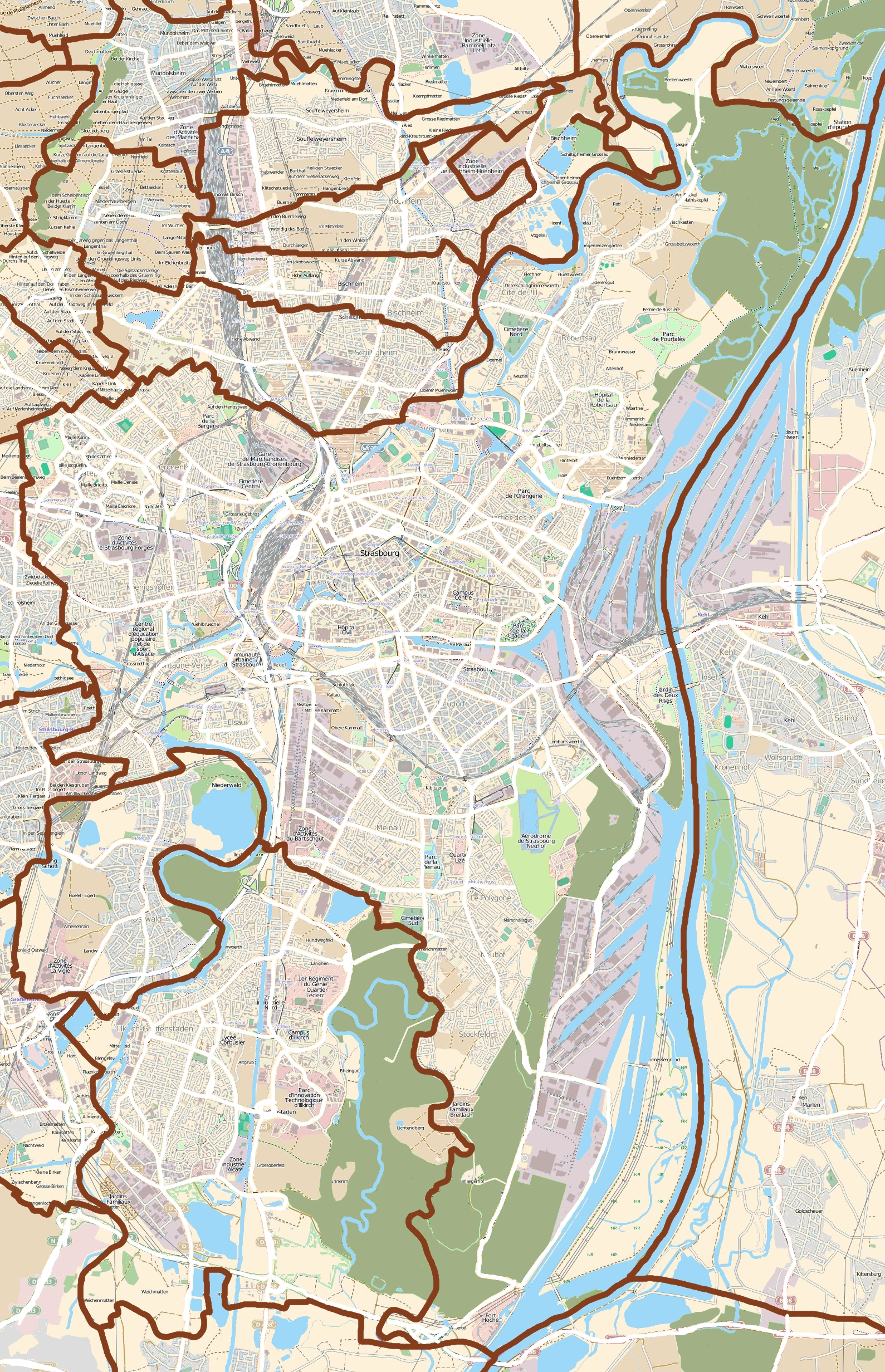
- Location within Strasbourg
- Established: 1907
- Location: 23-25, quai Saint-Nicolas, 67000 Strasbourg, France
- Coordinates: 48.579167°N 7.750556°E
- Type: Ethnography; Folk art
- Public transit access: Strasbourg tramway lines A and D, stop: Porte de l′Hôpital. CTS bus line 10, stop: Saint-Nicolas. CTS bus lines 14 and 24, stops: Porte de l′Hôpital or Ancienne Douane
- Website: en.musees.strasbourg.eu/alsatian-museum

The Musée alsacien (Alsatian museum) is a museum in Strasbourg in the Bas-Rhin department of France. It opened on 11 May 1907, and is dedicated to all aspects of (mostly rural) daily life in pre-industrial and early industrial Alsace. It contains over 5000 exhibits and is notable for the reconstruction of the interiors of several traditional houses. It also features a rich collection of artifacts documenting the everyday life of Alsatian Jews.

The museum is located in several Renaissance timber framed houses on the Quai Saint-Nicolas, on the banks of the Ill river. In 1917, it was bought by the city of Strasbourg.

Another, smaller, Musée alsacien exists in the city of Haguenau, 30 kilometers north of Strasbourg.

== Bibliography ==
- Le Musée Alsacien de Strasbourg, Éditions des musées de la ville de Strasbourg 2006, ISBN 2-35125-005-2
