= Hellmouth =

Mythological entrance to Hell

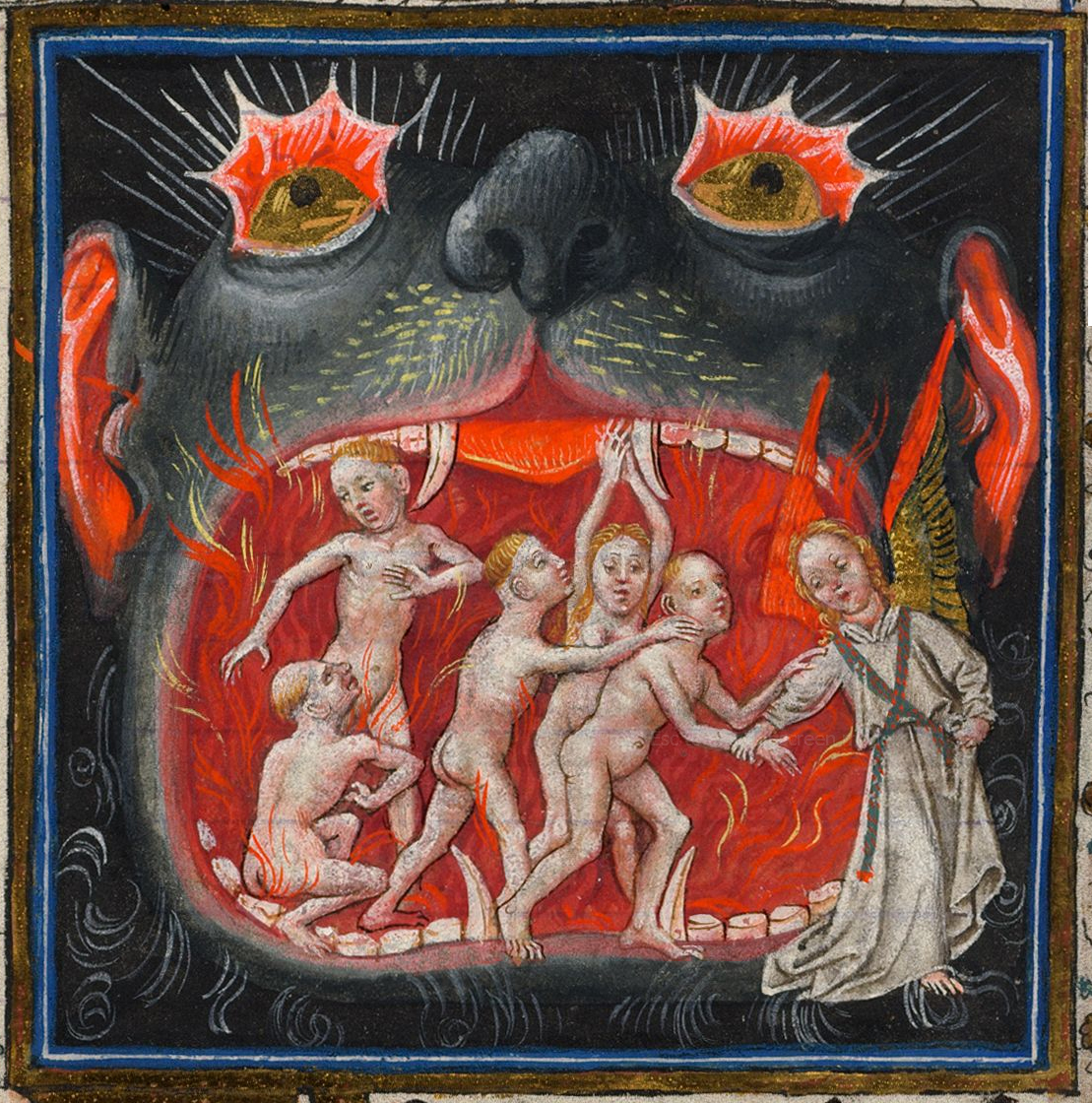
Miniature from the Hours of Catherine of Cleves, Morgan Library & Museum, MS M.945, f. 107r

A hellmouth is a depiction of the entrance to Hell as the gaping mouth of a huge monster. Hellmouths are first present in Anglo-Saxon art and often appear in scenes of the Last Judgment and Harrowing of Hell in the late medieval period in Europe and at times, during the Renaissance and later. Hellmouths were used in polemical popular prints after the Protestant Reformation, when figures from the opposite side would be shown disappearing into the mouth. A notable late appearance is in the two versions of a painting by El Greco of about 1578. Political cartoons showed Napoleon leading his troops into a hell mouth.

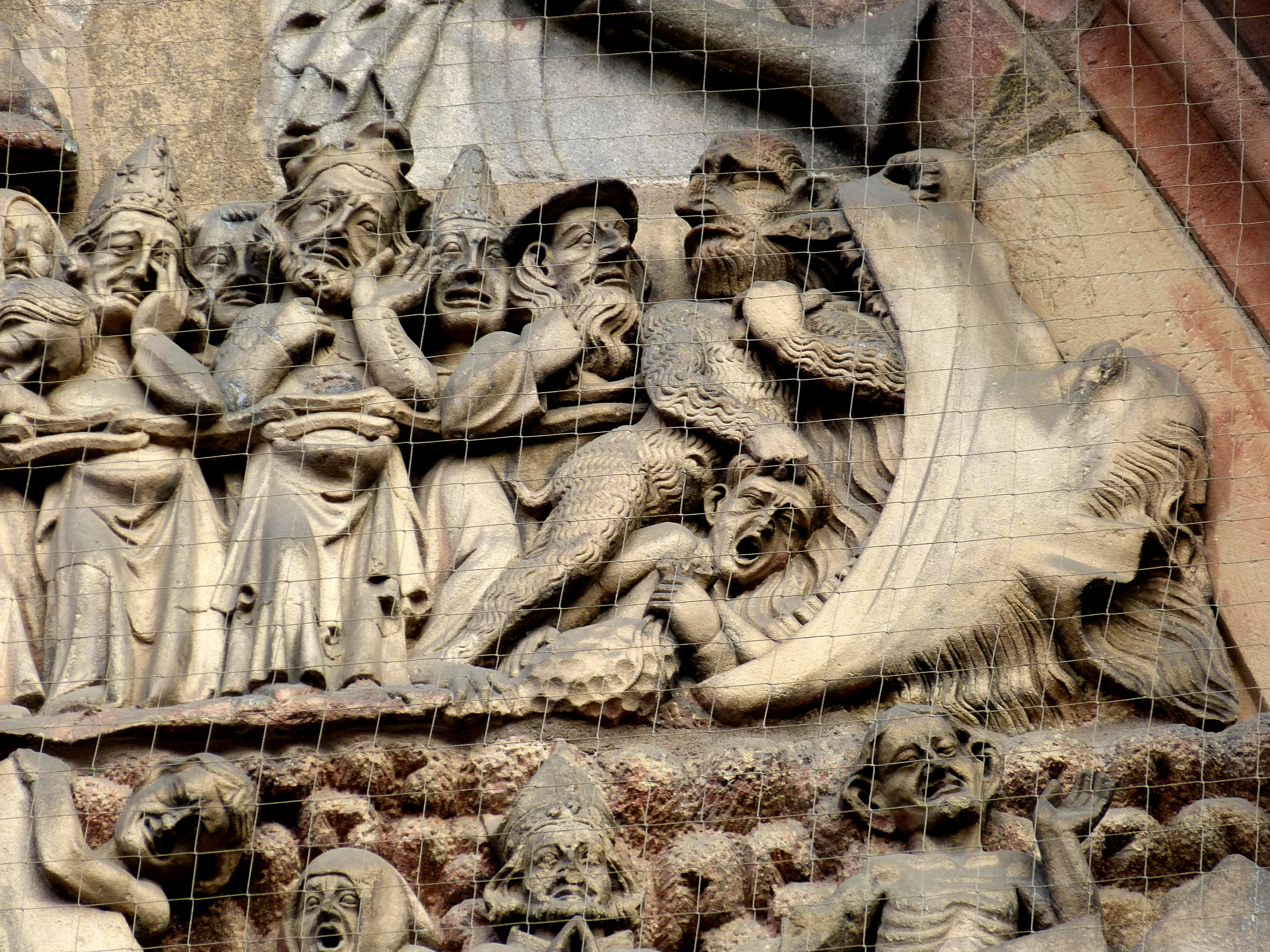
Nuremberg, Saint Lawrence parish church: Western portal, 1340s

Medieval and early modern theater incorporated hellmouths as props and mechanical devices like trapdoors to give the audience a dramatic, vivid vision of an entrance to Hell.

A hellmouth was intended to remind a Christian audience of the danger of damnation. Those shown entering, or already inside, are typically shown naked, their clothing not having survived the general resurrection of the dead that is often part of the same image. Some, even if naked, wear headgear indicating their rank at the top of society, with the papal tiara, king's crown and bishop's mitre the most common. Far rarer are indications of people being non-Christian, such as the Jewish hat.

== History ==
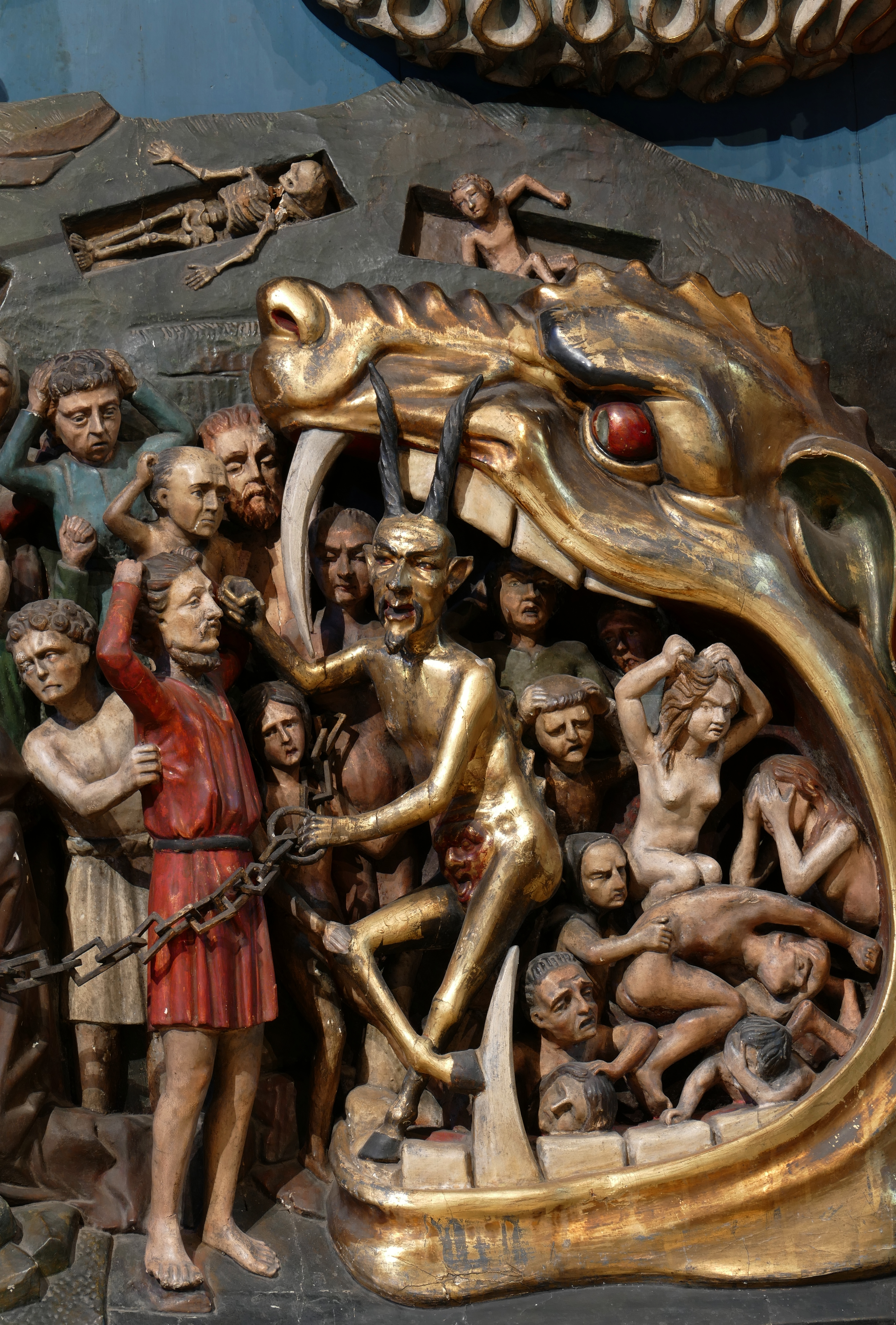
St. George's Church, Haguenau, Alsace, painted wood, 1496

According to art historian Meyer Schapiro, the oldest example of an animal-like hellmouth appears on an ivory carving of ca. 800 in the Victoria and Albert Museum. Schapiro notes most examples before the 12th century are English with many showing the Harrowing of Hell, which appealed to Anglo-Saxon taste, as a successful military raid by Christ. Schapiro has speculated that the subject may have drawn from the pagan myth of the Crack of Doom, with the mouth that of the wolf-monster Fenrir, slain by Vidar, who is used as a symbol of Christ on the Gosforth Cross and other pieces of Anglo-Scandinavian art. In the assimilation of Christianised Viking populations in northern England, pagan mythological imagery merged Christian ones, in hogback grave markers for example.

Satan himself is often shown sitting in Hell eating the damned. According to G. D. Schmidt this is a separate image, and a hellmouth should not be considered to be the mouth of Satan, although Hofmann is inclined to disagree with this.

In the Anglo-Saxon Vercelli Homilies (4:46–48) Satan is likened to a dragon swallowing the damned:

... ne cumaþ þa næfre of þæra wyrma seaðe & of þæs dracan ceolan þe is Satan nemned.

Translation:

[they] never come out of the pit of snakes and of the throat of the dragon which is called Satan.

The whale-monster Leviathan (translated from Hebrew, Job 41:1, "wreathed animal") has been equated with this description, although this is hard to confirm in the earliest appearances. However, in The Whale, an Old English poem from the Exeter Book, the mouth of Hell is compared to a whale's mouth:

The whale has another trick: when he is hungry, he opens his mouth and a sweet smell comes out. The fish are tricked by the smell and they enter into his mouth. Suddenly the whale's jaws close.

Likewise, any man who lets himself be tricked by a sweet smell and led to sin will go into hell, opened by the devil—if he has followed the pleasures of the body and not those of the spirit. When the devil has brought them to hell, he clashes together the jaws, the gates of hell. No one can get out from them, just as no fish can escape from the mouth of the whale.

Later in the Middle Ages, the classical Cerberus also became associated with the image.

=== Later depictions ===
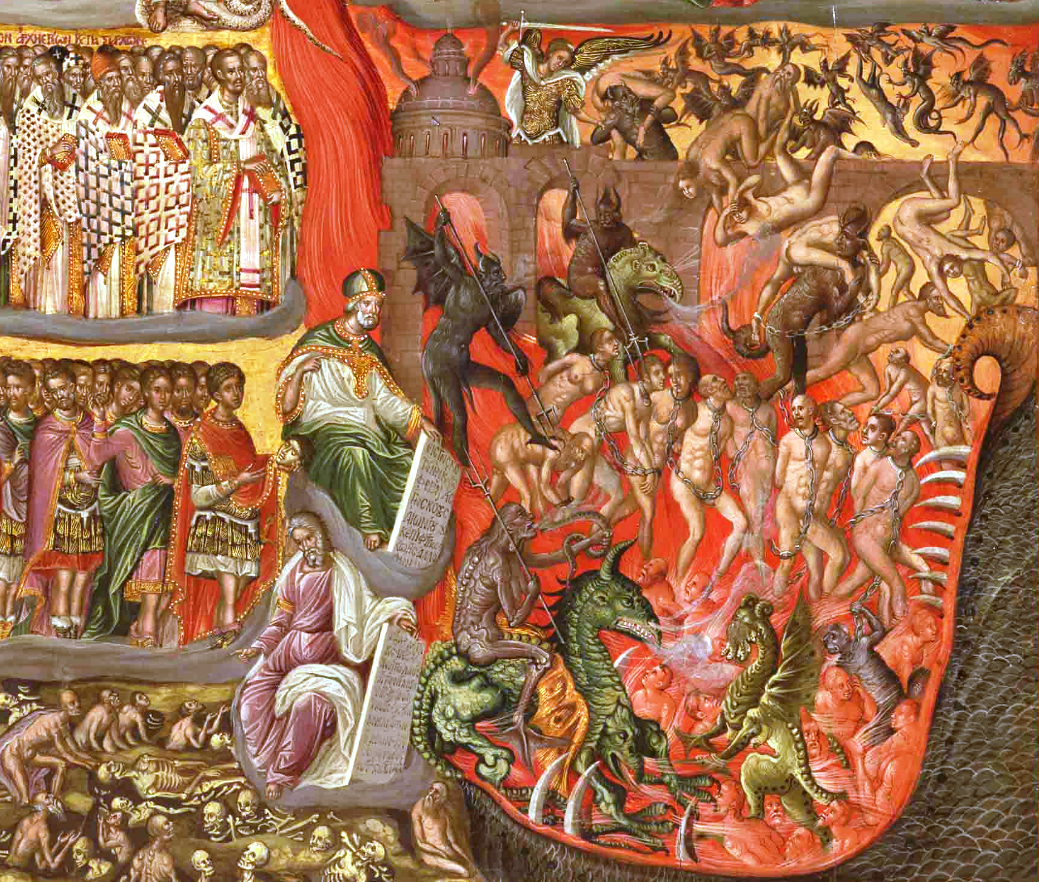
16th Century Hellmouth by Georgios Klontzas

In general, hellmouths appear less frequently in Italy by the late 14th century. In Northern European works by Hieronymous Bosch and his followers, where the wide interior of Hell is shown, a hellmouth is sometimes included. A hellmouth appears, swallowing a bishop, at bottom left in The Four Horsemen of the Apocalypse, a famous woodcut by Albrecht Dürer (c. 1497–98).

Greek painters were the exception to the decline in the depiction of hellmouth. Painters of the Cretan School and the Heptanese School continued to depict variations of hellmouths in their Last Judgement imagery. Georgios Klontzas (1535–1608) created a significant amount of works depicting hellmouths, some include The Last Judgment and The Last Judgement Triptych. Other works featuring hellmouth were completed by Frantzeskos Kavertzas in 1641 entitled The Last Judgment and Leos Moskos in 1653, entitled The Last Judgment.

== Gallery ==
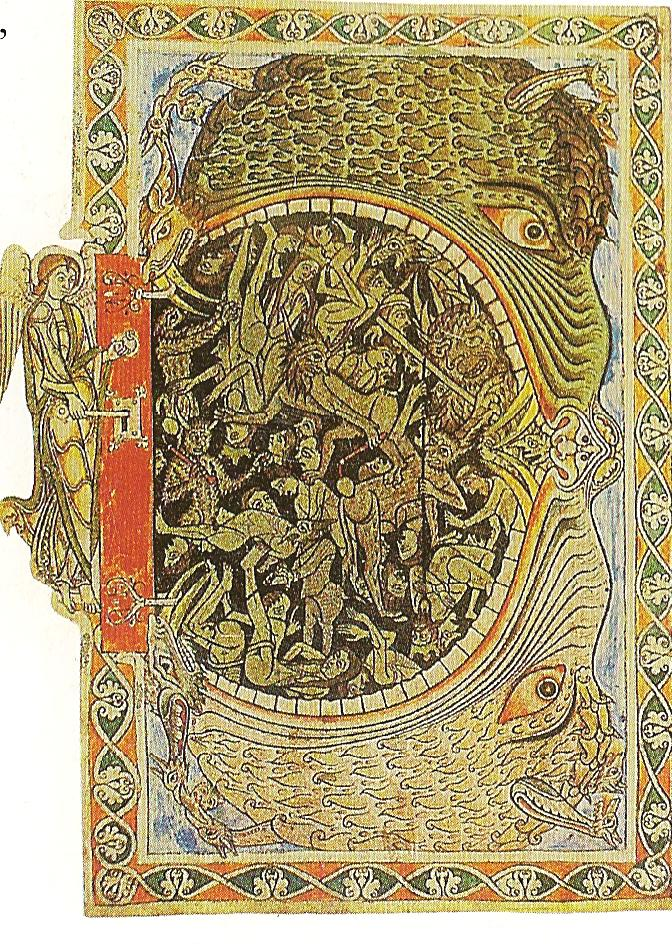
Hellmouth, locked by an archangel, from the Winchester Psalter of about 1150

Hell Mouth or Jaws of Hell, Bourges Cathedral, ca. 12th century

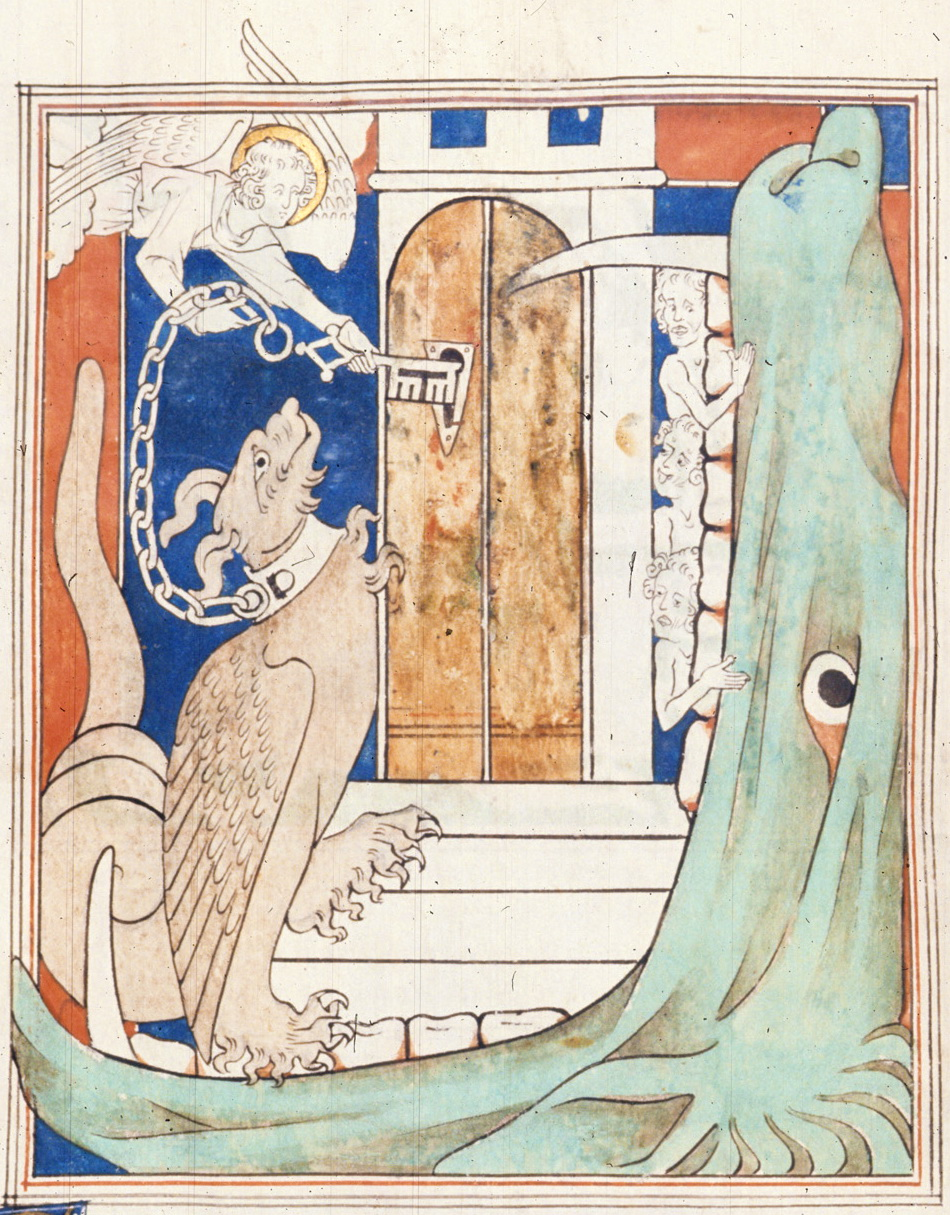
Queen Mary Apocalypse—BL Royal MS 19 B XV f. 38v Angel with key and dragon, 1st qtr 14th century

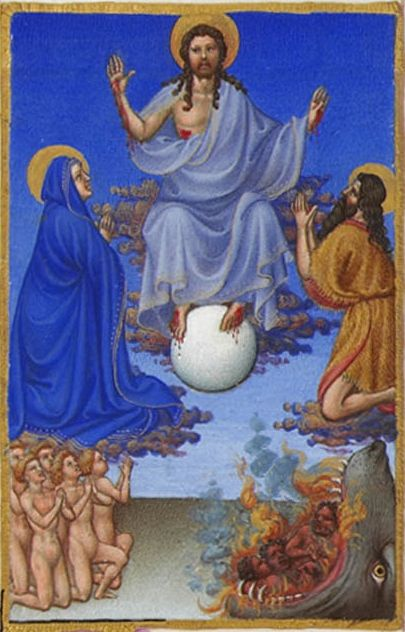
Simplified Last Judgment from Les Très Riches Heures du duc de Berry, c. 1440s

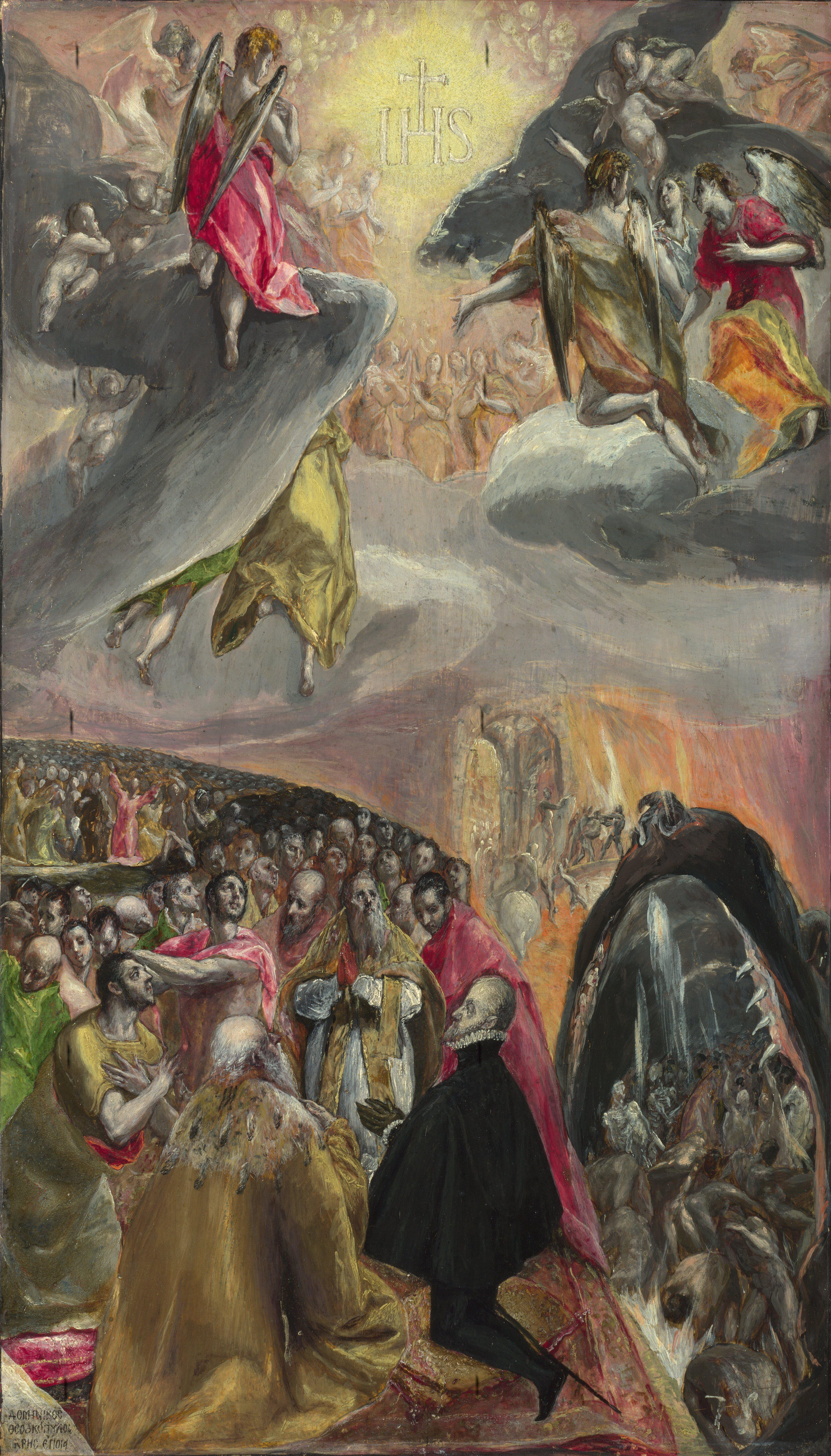
El Greco, The Adoration of the Name of Jesus, 1578–80, National Gallery

The Sanctuary Ring on the door of Durham Cathedral was inspired by medieval Hellmouth images

== General references ==
- Hofmann Petra (2008). Infernal Imagery in Anglo-Saxon Charters. PhD thesis. St Andrews, Fife, Scotland: University of St Andrews. OCLC 944163293.
