= Ancienne Douane =

Ancienne Douane ("old custom house") is the name of several places in France and Belgium, referring to former borders with Germany:

- Ancienne Douane (Colmar)
- Ancienne Douane (Haguenau)
- Ancienne Douane (Strasbourg)
- former virage de l'Ancienne Douane at Circuit de Spa-Francorchamps
