= Hôtel de Ville, Haguenau =

Town hall in Haguenau, France

Hôtel de Ville
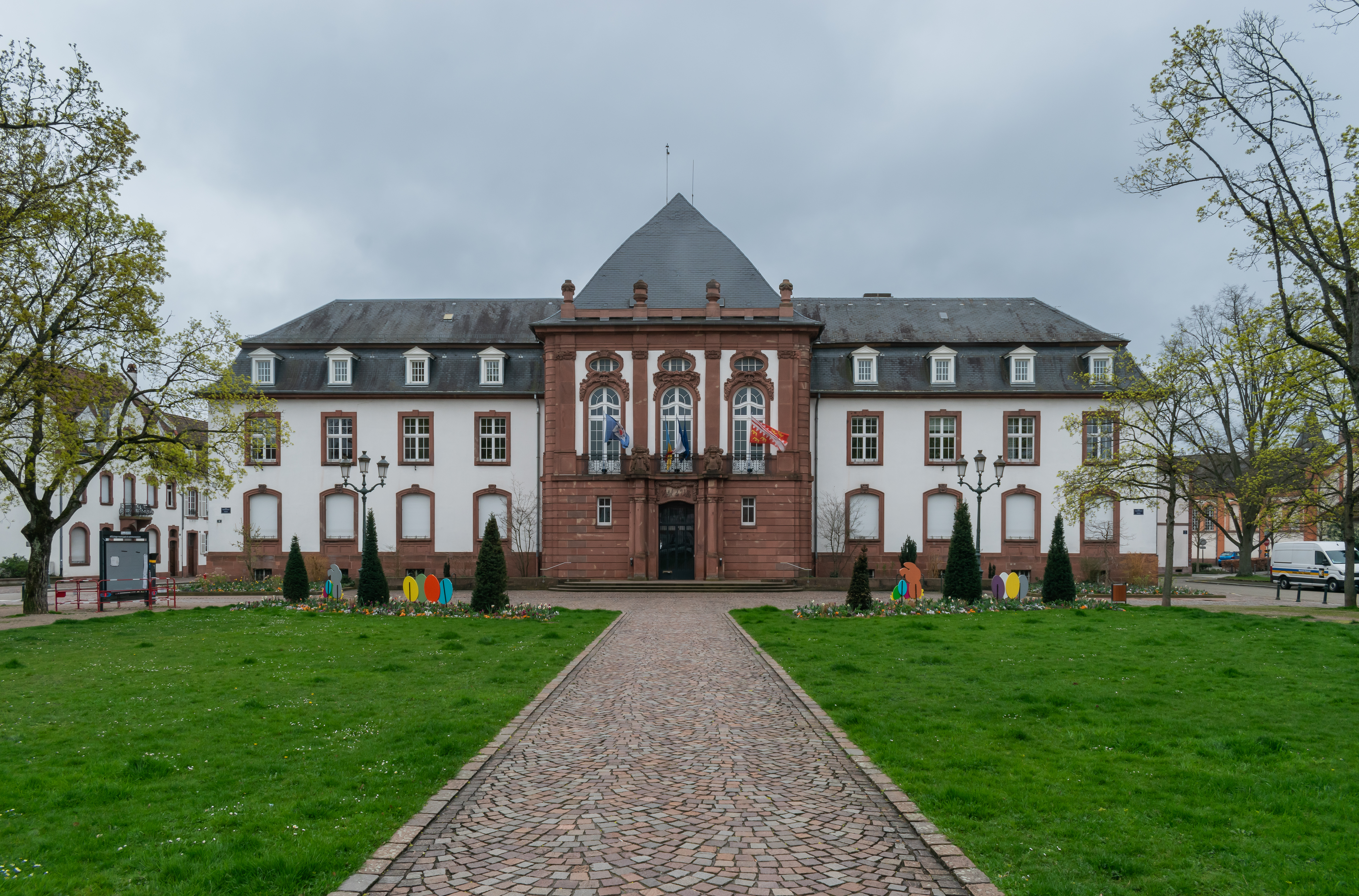
- The main frontage of the Hôtel de Ville in April 2023
- Interactive map of the Hôtel de Ville area

General information
- Type: City hall
- Architectural style: Baroque Revival style
- Location: Haguenau, France
- Coordinates: 48.8172°N 7.7875°E
- Completed: 1910

The Hôtel de Ville (French pronunciation: [otɛl də vil], City Hall) is a municipal building in Haguenau, Bas-Rhin, in eastern France, standing on Place Charles de Gaulle.

== History ==
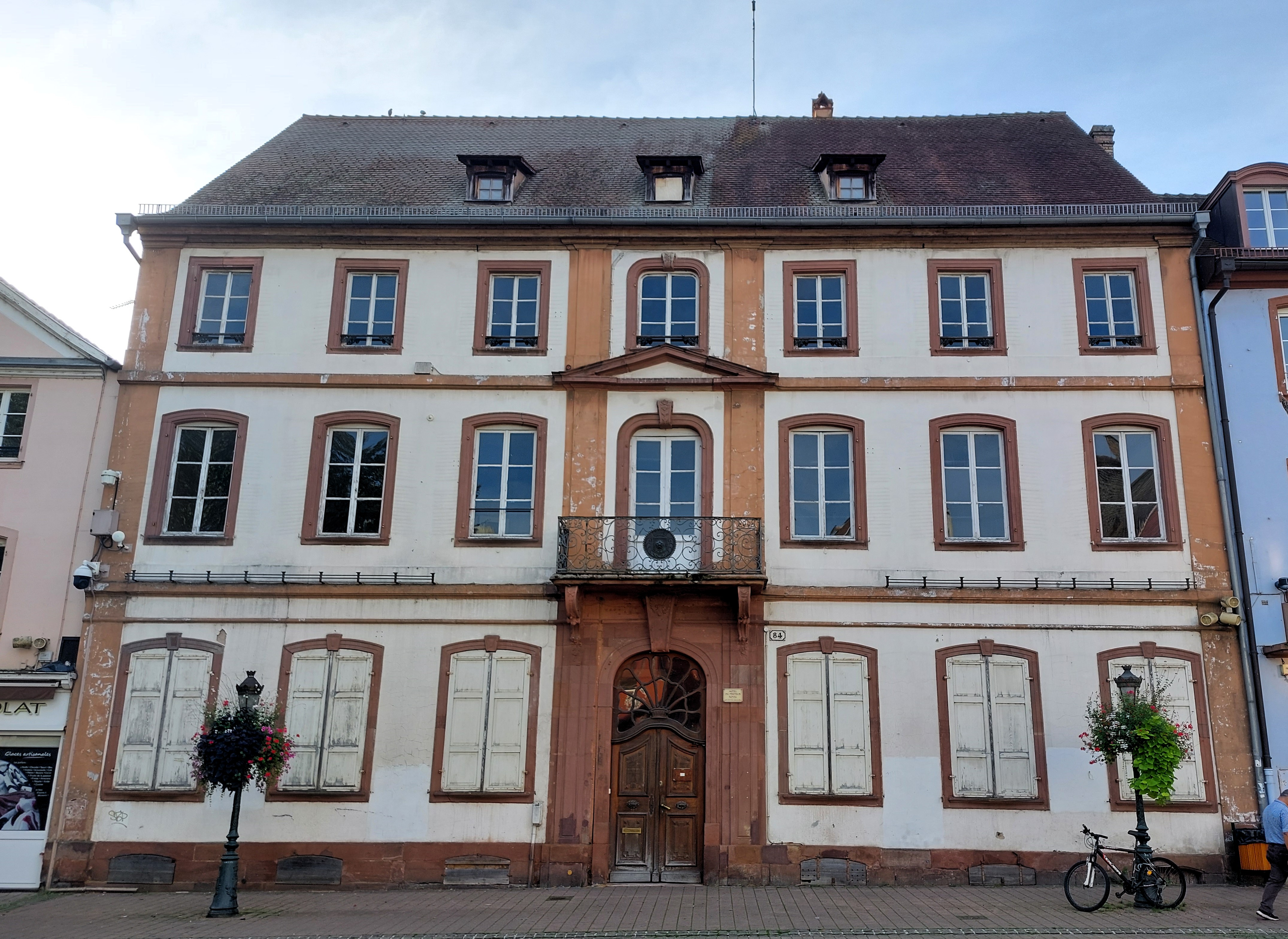
The second town hall

The first town hall in Haguenau was on the north side of the town square (now Rue de Général Gérard). It was designed in the medieval style and completed in around 1330. It was subsequently extended to the east and later to the north. It was remodelled by a local stonemason, Frédéric Hammer, in 1541, and a stone column, sculpted by Hammer in pink sandstone, was placed in front of the town hall at that time. The building was badly damaged in a fire initiated by General Joseph de Montclar on the orders of Louis XIV, to prevent the town falling into Dutch hands, in January 1677 during the Franco-Dutch War. It was subsequently restored but then demolished in 1784.

Following the French Revolution, the town council decided to acquire a new town hall. The building they selected was the former house of the Prêteur Royal (royal lender), Jean Philippe Antoine de Cointoux, on the south side of the town square (now Grand'Rue). The house was designed in the neoclassical style, built in brick with a cement render finish and was completed in the third quarter of the 18th century. The design involved a symmetrical main frontage of seven bays facing onto Grand'Rue. The central bay featured a round headed doorway with a keystone and a pink sandstone surround on the ground floor, a French door with a keystone, a sandstone surround and a balcony on the first floor, and a window with a keystone and a sandstone surround on the second floor. On the first floor, the central bay was flanked by pilasters supporting a pediment. The other bays were fenestrated by segmental headed windows on the ground and first floors and by square headed windows on the second floor, which also featured sandstone surrounds. The building was acquired by the council and converted for municipal use as the second town hall in 1802. After it was no longer required for municipal use, it was converted for use as the tribunal d'instance (district court).

After the town was liberated by troops of the US 79th Infantry Division on 11 December 1944, during the Second World War, the former mayor, Alphonse Désiré Brumpt, briefly returned to take possession of the town hall. A large crowd of residents assembled in front of the building. During the final German offensive, between January and March 1945, the town and its town hall were briefly back under German control, before Brumpt could return on a permanent basis after the second liberation of the town on 16 March 1945.

In the early 1950s, the council decided to acquire a more substantial building. The building they selected, on the south side of the Rue de la Romaine, had been commissioned as the tribunal d'instance (district court). The building had been designed in the Baroque Revival style, built in brick with a cement render finish and was completed in 1910.

The design involved a symmetrical main frontage of 11 bays facing onto what is now Place Charles de Gaulle. The central section of three bays, which was slightly projected forward, was faced with pink sandstone on the ground floor and surmounted by a pyramid-shaped roof. In the central bay, there was a segmental headed doorway flanked by Ionic order columns surmounted by shields, which were supported by puttos. On the first floor, there were three round headed windows with ornate surrounds and iron railings and, on the second floor, there were three elliptically-shaped windows also with ornate surrounds. The bays on the upper floors of the central section were flanked by Ionic order pilasters supporting an entablature, a cornice and a parapet as well as four finials. The wings were fenestrated by segmental headed windows with masks on the ground floor, by square headed windows with keystones on the first floor and by dormer windows at attic level. The council and the court agreed to exchange buildings in 1955.
