= Forest of Haguenau =

Coordinates: 48°51′N 7°53′E

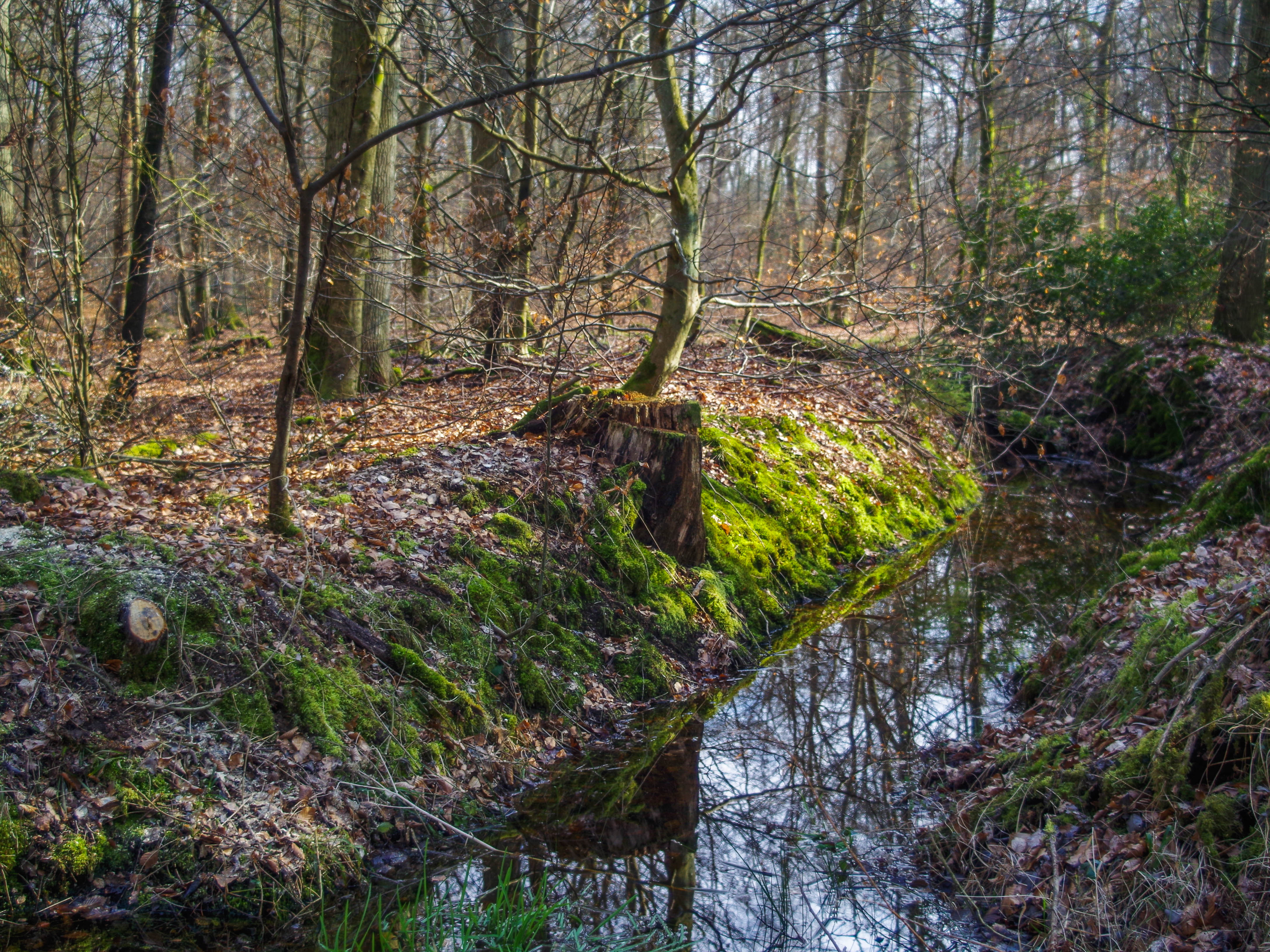

Forest of Haguenau (French: Forêt de Haguenau; Alsatian: Hàwenauer Wàld; German: Heiliger Forst or Hagenauer Forst) lies to the north of the town of Haguenau. It has a surface area of 210 square kilometres (81 sq mi) and is the largest undivided forest in France.

Many Bronze Age and Iron Age artifacts have been found in the forest. They are on display in the Musée historique de Haguenau.
