= Haguenau =

Haguenau Hàwenau / Hàjenöi (Alsatian)
- Subprefecture and commune
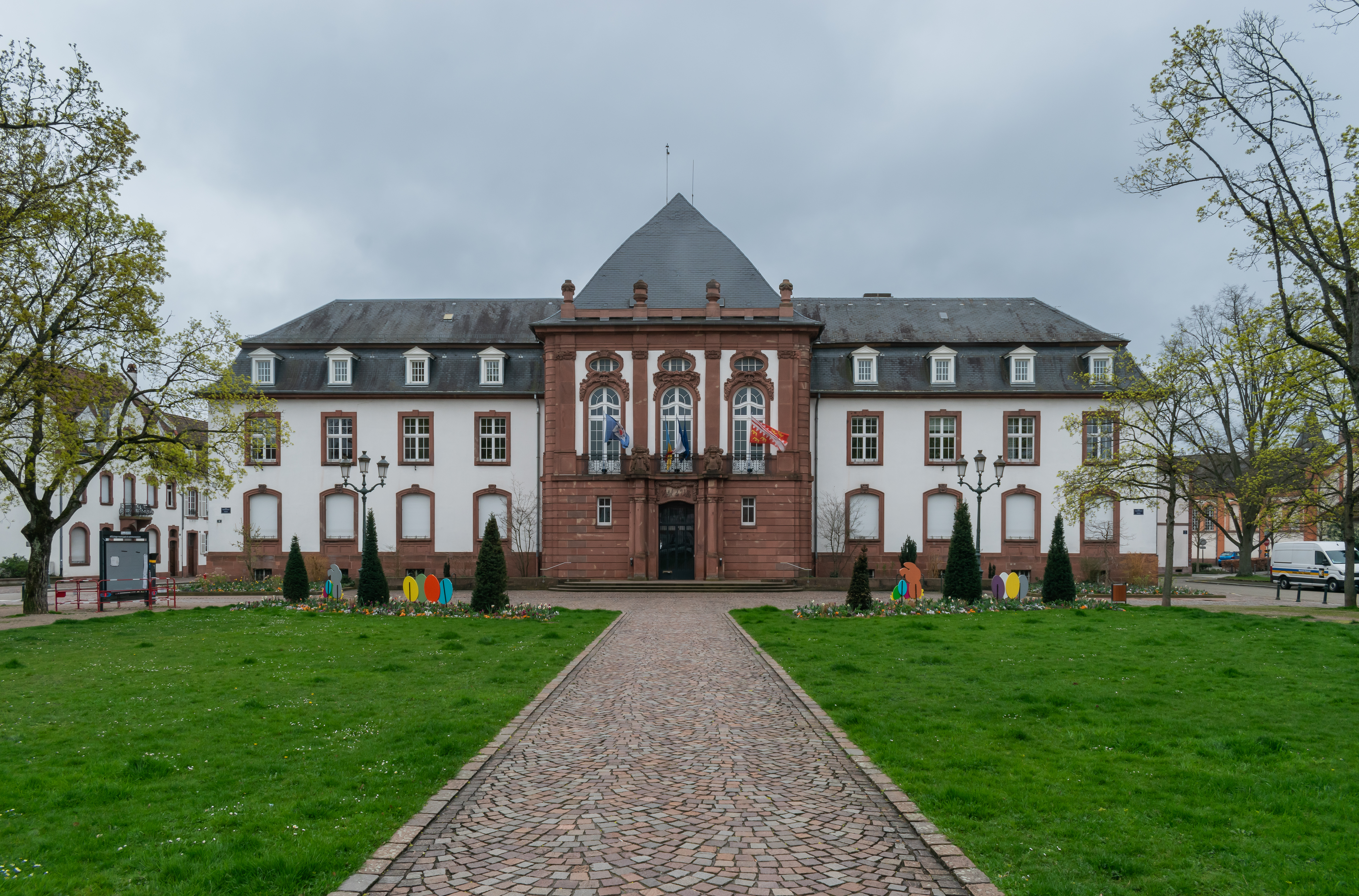
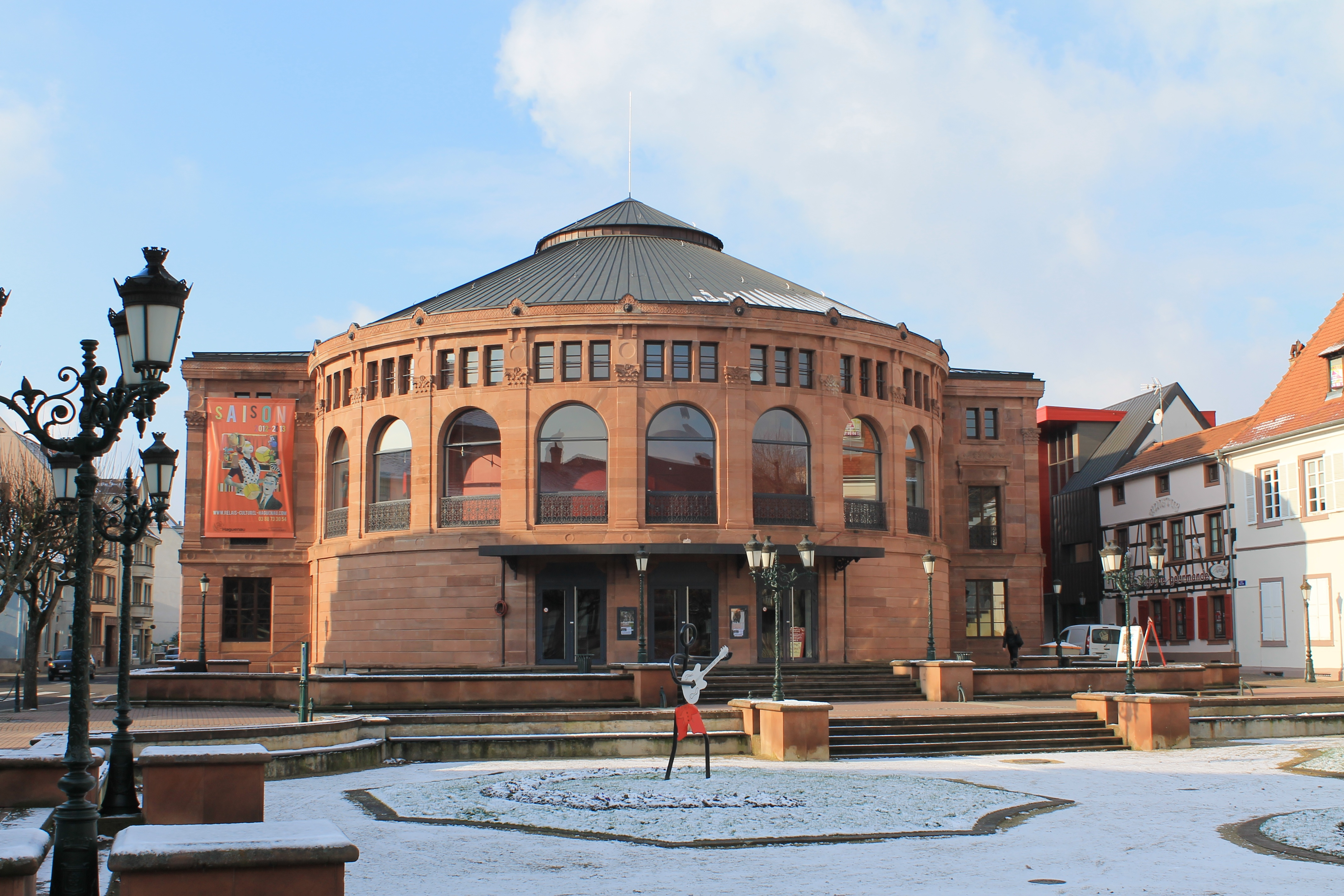
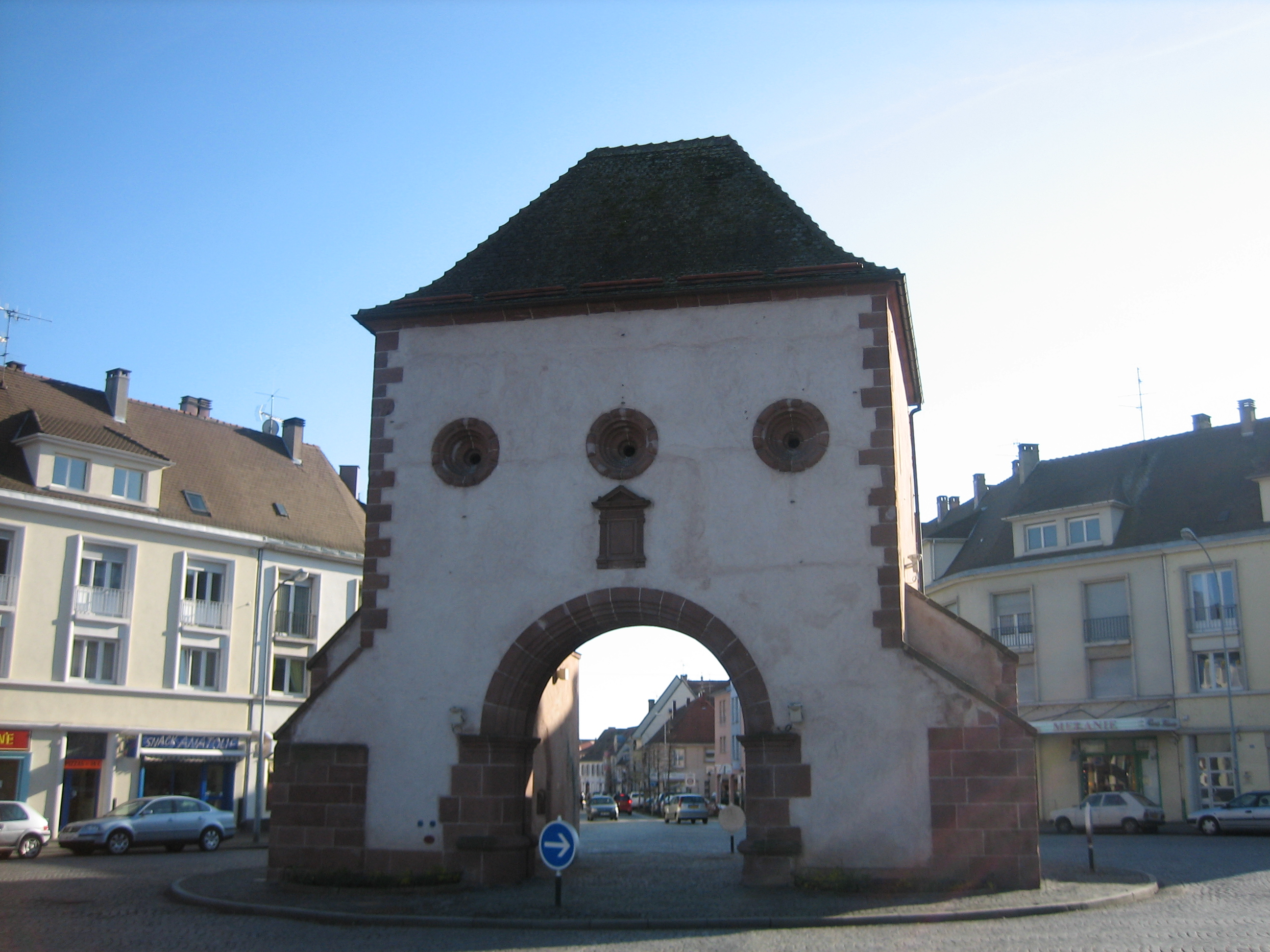
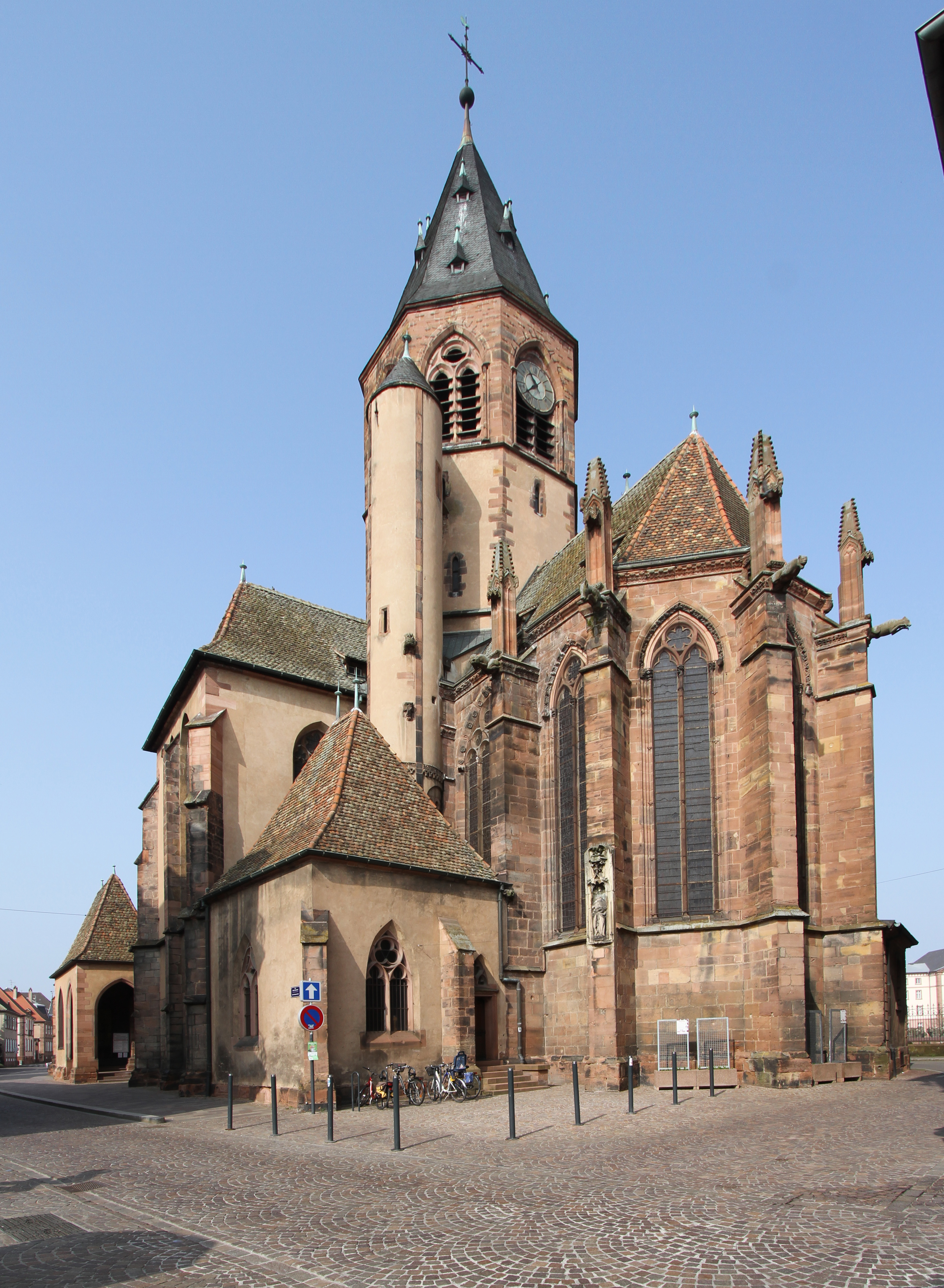
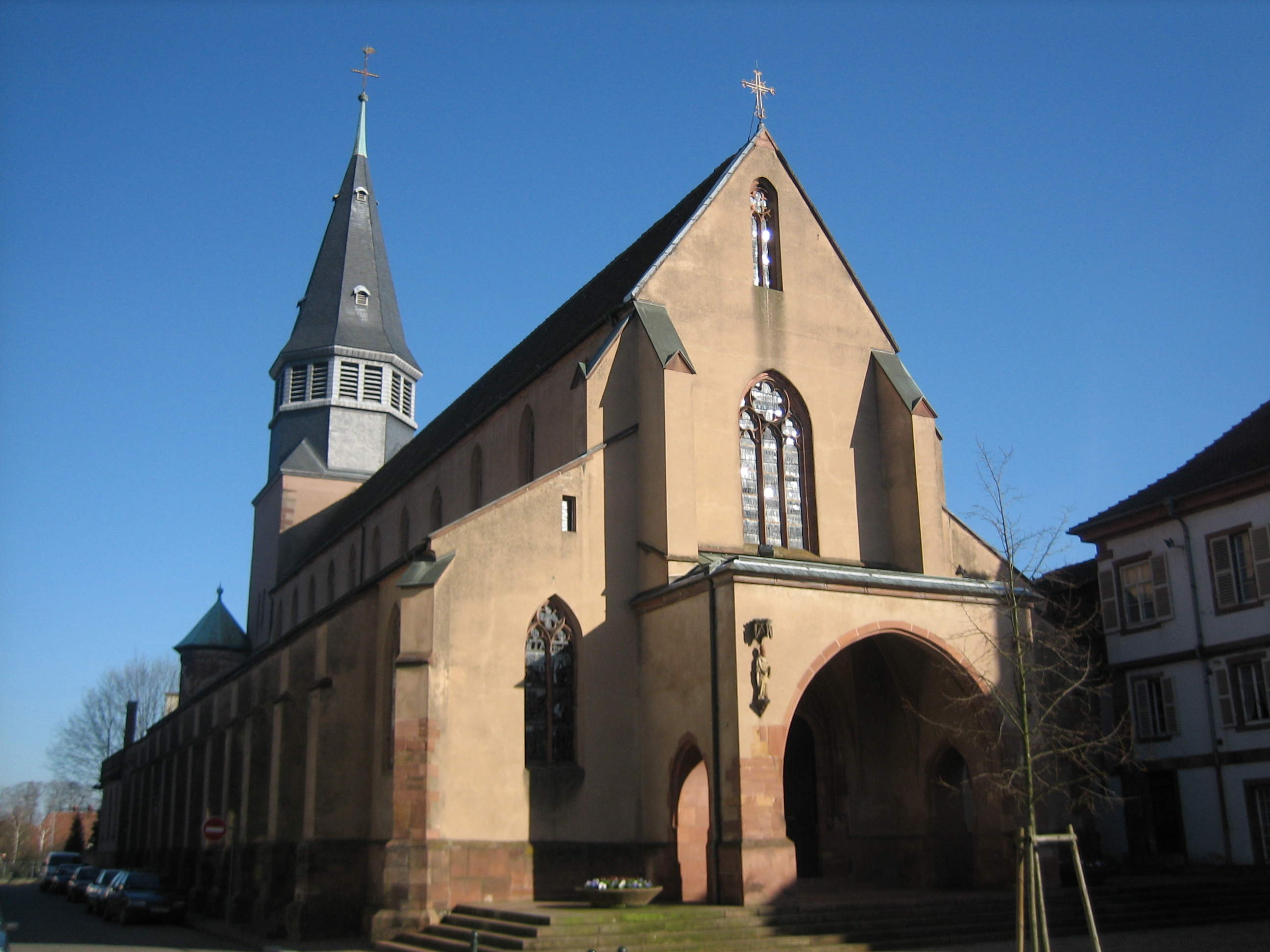
- Hôtel de Ville Théâtre municipal Porte de Wissembourg St. George's Church Saint-Nicolas Church

- Coat of arms
- Location of Haguenau
- Location within France Location within Grand Est
- Coordinates: 48°49′N 7°47′E
- Country: France
- Region: Grand Est
- Department: Bas-Rhin
- Arrondissement: Haguenau-Wissembourg
- Canton: Haguenau
- Intercommunality: CA Haguenau

Government
  - Mayor (2020–2026): Claude Sturni (DVD)
- Area^{1}: 182.59 km^{2} (70.50 sq mi)
- Elevation: 150 m (490 ft)
- Highest elevation: 203 m (666 ft)
- Lowest elevation: 115 m (377 ft)
- Population (2023): 36,391
  - Density: 199.30/km^{2} (516.20/sq mi)
- Time zone: UTC+01:00 (CET)
  - Summer (DST): UTC+02:00 (CEST)
- INSEE/Postal code: 67180 /67500
- ^{1} French Land Register data, which excludes lakes, ponds, glaciers > 1 km^{2} (0.386 sq mi or 247 acres) and river estuaries.

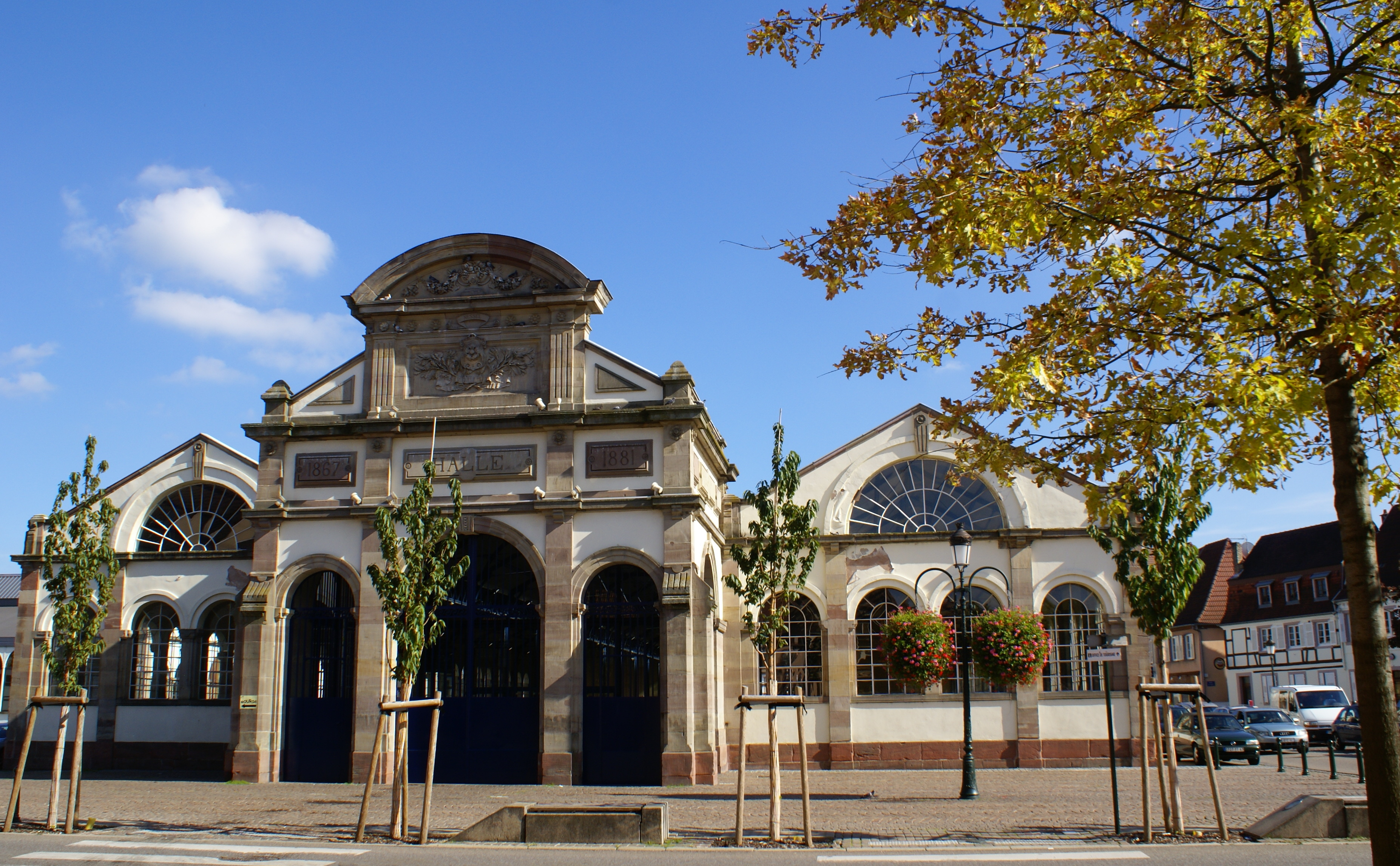
Hops hall, Hagenau

Haguenau (French: [aɡ(ə)no]; Alsatian: Hàwenau [ˈhaːvənau̯] or Hàjenöi [ˈhaːjənœi̯]; historical English: Hagenaw) is a commune in the Bas-Rhin department of France, of which it is a sub-prefecture.

It is second in size in the Bas-Rhin only to Strasbourg, some 30 km (19 mi) to the south. To the north of the town, the Forest of Haguenau is the largest undivided forest in France.

Hagenau was an imperial city of the Holy Roman Empire and a leading member of the Decapole, a league of ten Alsatian imperial cities. The Peace of Westphalia in 1648 transferred certain imperial rights over these cities to France, but Hagenau retained its imperial status until its annexation into the Kingdom of France under the Treaties of Nijmegen in 1679. Following the Franco-Prussian War, the city became part of the German Empire in 1871 and returned to France after the First World War. This transfer was officially ratified in 1919 with the Treaty of Versailles. Germany then annexed the town in 1940 during World War II, before the town and region returned to France again in 1945.

Haguenau is a rapidly growing town, its population having increased from 22,944 inhabitants in 1968 to 36,391 inhabitants in 2023. Haguenau's functional urban area has grown from 54,415 inhabitants in 1968 to 78,898 inhabitants in 2023.

== History ==
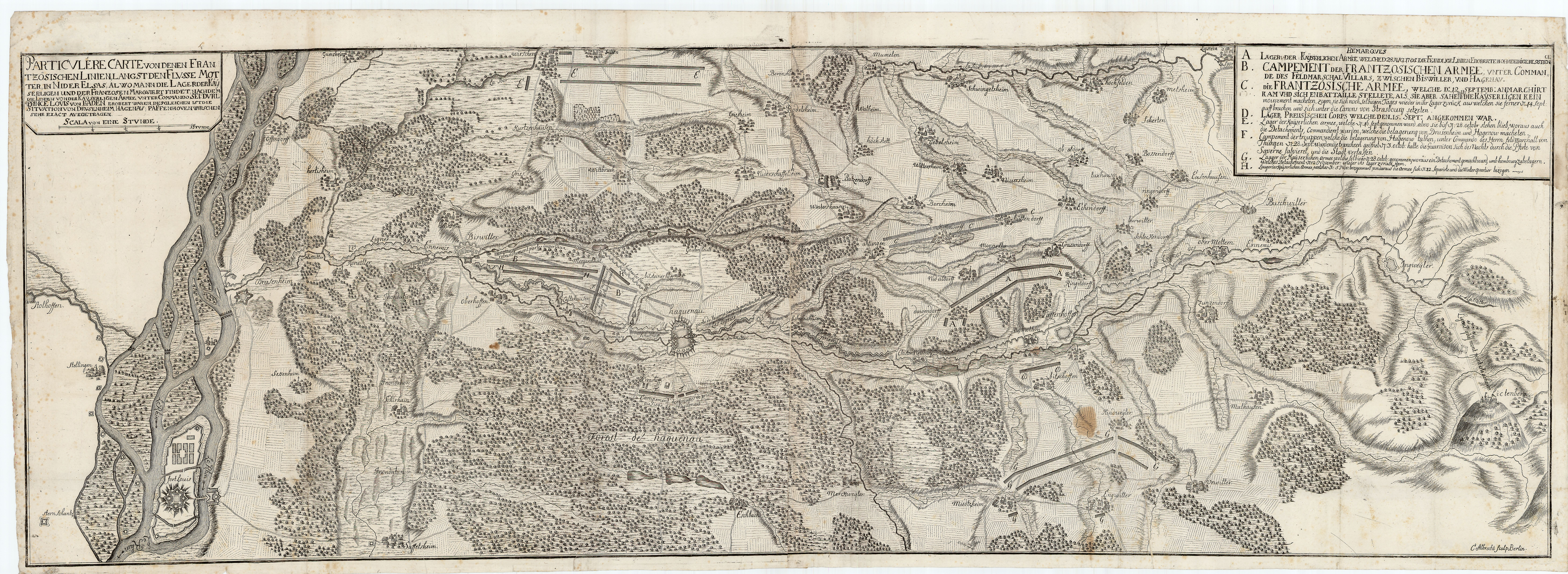
Siege of Haguenau 1705

Haguenau dates from the beginning of the 12th century, when Duke Frederick II the One-Eyed (1090 – 6 April 1147) of Swabia erected a hunting lodge on an island in the river Moder. The medieval King and Holy Roman Emperor Frederick I Barbarossa fortified the settlement and gave it town rights, important for further development, in 1154. On the site of the hunting lodge he founded an imperial palace he regarded as his favourite residence. In this palace were preserved the "Crown Jewels of the Holy Roman Empire", i.e. the jewelled imperial crown, sceptre, imperial orb, and sword of Charlemagne.

Richard of Cornwall, King of the Romans, made it an imperial city in 1257. Subsequently, through Rudolph I of Germany — the first Habsburg emperor — Haguenau became the seat of the Landvogt of Hagenau, the German imperial advocate in Lower Alsace. In the 14th century, it housed the executive council of the Decapole, a defensive and offensive association of ten Alsatian towns against external aggression, economic expansion and related political instability. In the Peace of Westphalia in 1648, Alsace was ceded to France, which had repeatedly invaded and looted the region in the past. In 1673, King Louis XIV had the fortifications as well as the remains of the king's palace razed in order to extinguish German traditions. Haguenau was recaptured by German troops in 1675, but was taken again by the French two years later, when it was nearly destroyed by fire set by looting French troops.

In 1793, Prussians and Austrians had occupied Lower Alsace from the Lauter to Moder to support the Royalists and before the year's end were driven back over the border by the French Revolutionary Army, causing the "great flight".

In 1871, Haguenau was ceded to the German Empire upon its victory in the Franco-Prussian War; the community was made part of Alsace-Lorraine, with its Germanic spelling (Hagenau) restored.

The Haguenau Airport was built in 1916 by the German military to train fighter and bomber pilots to fight in the First World War.

Hagenau was part of the briefly independent Republic of Alsace-Lorraine after World War I, before being returned to France in 1919.

=== Second World War ===
In the Second World War, Germany retook the town in 1940.

In November 1944, the surrounding area was under the control of the 256th Volksgrenadier Division under the command of General Gerhard Franz.

On 1 December 1944, the 314th Infantry Regiment of the 79th Division, XV Corps, 7th U.S. Army, moved into the area. On 7 December, the regiment was ordered to take the town and the town forest to its north, which contained German ammunition dumps. The attack began at 0645 on 9 December, and sometime during the night of 10 December and the early morning of 11 December the Germans withdrew under the cover of darkness, leaving the town proper largely under American control. Before they withdrew, the Germans demolished bridges, useful buildings, and even the town park.

In late January, German forces retook the town. Most of the inhabitants fled with the assistance of the U.S. Army, which soon launched an effort to take the town back. The 313th Infantry Regiment of the 79th Division was relieved by the 101st Airborne Division on 5 February 1945. The 36th Infantry Division would relieve the 101st on 23 February 1945. On 15 March, the Allies launched Operation Undertone, a combined effort of the U.S. Seventh and French 1st Armies of the U.S. Sixth Army Group, to drive the Germans back along a 75km line from Saarbrücken to Haguenau. The last German soldier was not cleared out of the town until 19 March 1945, after house-to-house fighting.

Much of the town had been destroyed, despite the Allied reluctance to use artillery to clear out the Germans. Technical Sergeant Morris E. Crain, Company E, 141st Infantry Regiment, 36th Infantry Division was posthumously awarded the Medal of Honor for providing covering fire for his men on 13 March 1945.

=== Foo fighter sighting ===
On 22 December 1944, a pilot of the 415th Night Fighter Squadron, in a Northrop P-61 Black Widow, was followed by two large orange objects for two minutes. Time magazine printed the report on January 15 1945, and gave the sighting the name 'Foo Fighter'.

== Population ==
Historical population

Year	Pop.	±% p.a.
1793	6,426	—
1800	7,094	+1.42%
1806	7,395	+0.69%
1821	9,002	+1.32%
1831	9,697	+0.75%
1836	9,694	−0.01%
1841	10,349	+1.32%
1846	11,196	+1.59%
1851	11,351	+0.28%
1856	11,417	+0.12%
1861	11,071	−0.61%
1866	11,427	+0.64%
1871	11,388	−0.07%
1875	11,786	+0.86%
1880	12,688	+1.49%
1885	13,469	+1.20%
1890	14,752	+1.84%
1895	17,039	+2.92%
1900	17,968	+1.07%

Year	Pop.	±% p.a.
1905	18,737	+0.84%
1910	18,868	+0.14%
1921	15,803	−1.60%
1926	17,671	+2.26%
1931	19,514	+2.00%
1936	22,523	+2.91%
1946	17,337	−2.58%
1954	19,531	+1.50%
1962	20,457	+0.58%
1968	22,944	+1.93%
1975	25,147	+1.32%
1982	26,629	+0.82%
1990	27,675	+0.48%
1999	32,242	+1.71%
2007	35,112	+1.07%
2012	34,406	−0.41%
2017	34,504	+0.06%
2023	36,391	+0.89%

Source: EHESS and INSEE (1968-2023)

== Economy ==
Centuries of troubled history in the buffer lands between France and Germany have given Haguenau a rich historical and cultural heritage which supports tourism. There is also a light manufacturing sector centred on the industrial zone to the west of the town. Here the presence nearby of significant retail developments testifies to Haguenau's importance as a regional commercial centre. The recent extension of the ring road has improved access to the commercial and industrial zones and reduced the traffic congestion which used to be a frequent challenge for vehicle drivers using the road which follows the line of the old town walls on the western side of town.

== Sights ==
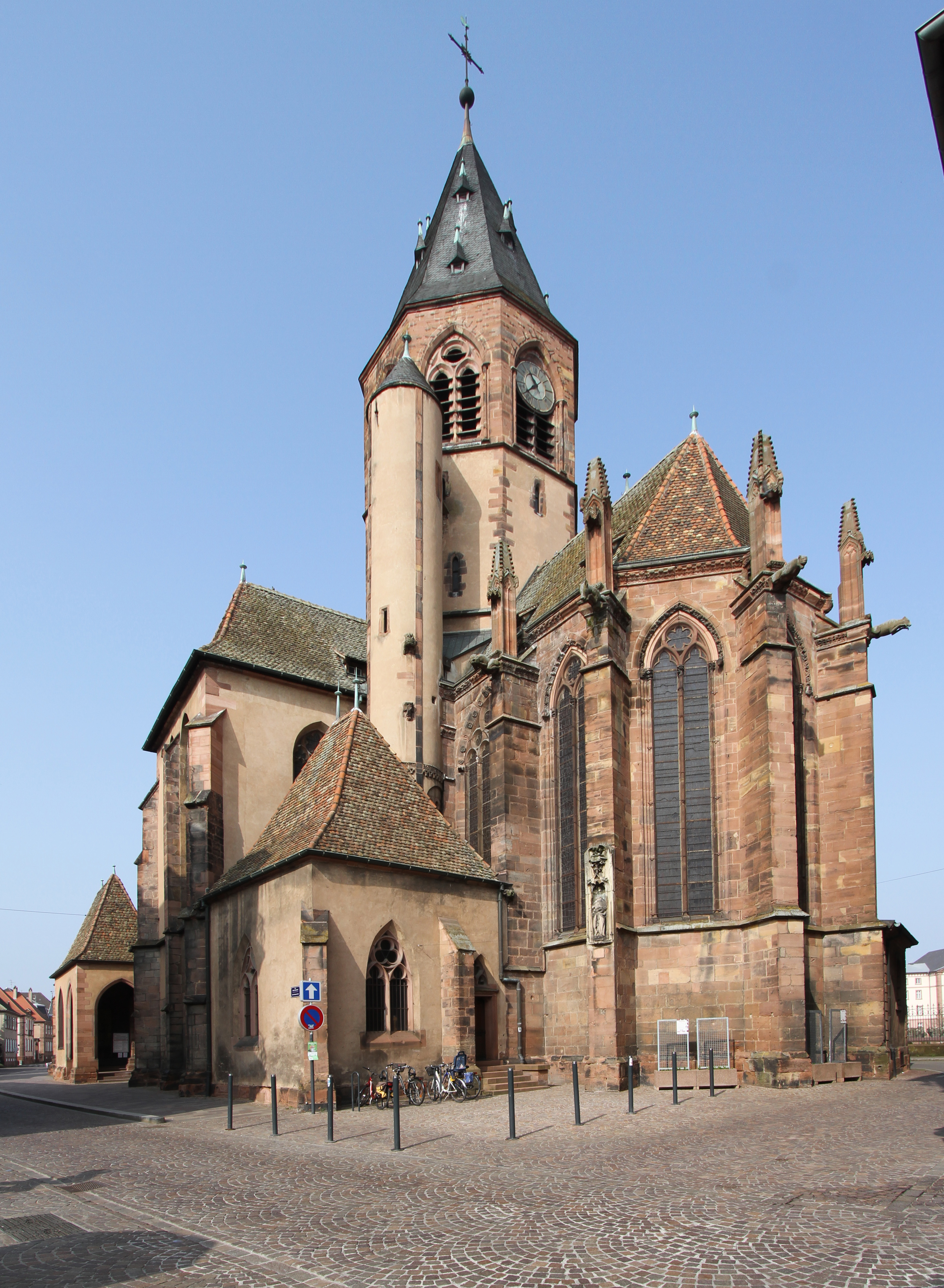
St. George's Church

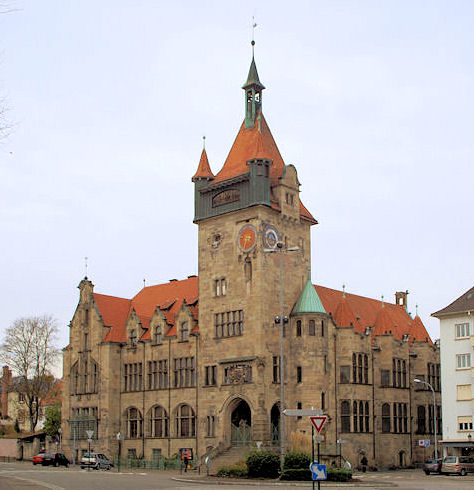
Historical Museum

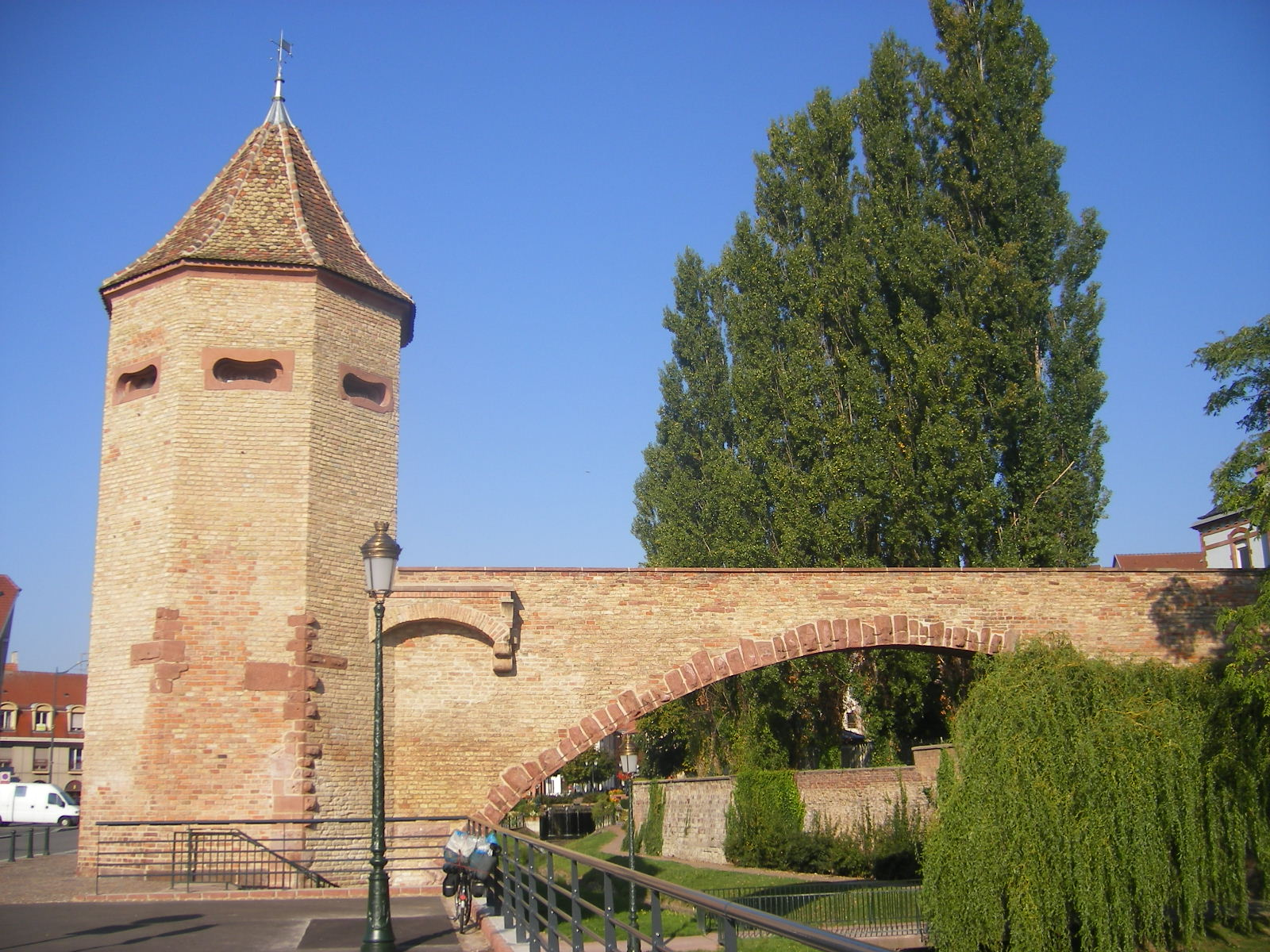
Fisher's gate

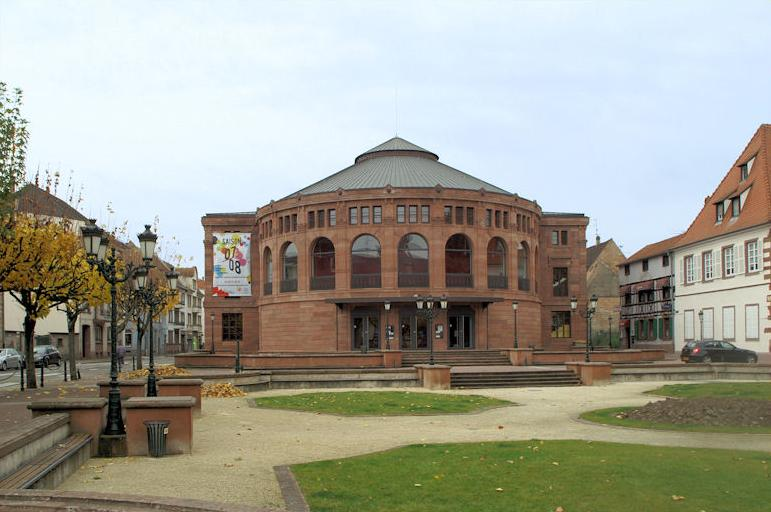
Theatre

=== Architecture ===
In spite of the extensive destruction Haguenau suffered during the many wars experienced by Alsace, especially the Thirty Years' War, the French conquest in 1677 and the Second World War, it still possesses monuments from nine centuries, even if nothing is left of arguably the most prestigious of them, Frederick I Barbarossa's imperial palace (Kaiserpfalz).

Medieval Haguenau retains three gates from its former fortification, the Tour des Chevaliers (Tower of the knights), the Tour des Pêcheurs (Tower of the fishermen) and the Porte de Wissembourg (Wissembourg gate), two fairly large Gothic churches, Saint-Georges and Saint-Nicolas, an ancient water-mill and the old custom-house (Ancienne Douane). Both Saint-Georges and Saint-Nicolas Church have lost many of their artistic treasures over the centuries, especially their medieval stained glass windows and outside sculptures. Still, both display to this day some fine liturgical furniture (altars, choir stalls, organ cases, church tabernacles, calvaries...). Saint-Nicolas has become the receptacle for the baroque wooden decoration of the church of the destroyed Neubourg Abbey nearby.

French Baroque and classicism has bequeathed the town several buildings, among which the former hospital and the current Hôtel de Ville which was completed in 1910. The Synagogue (1820) is a fine example of French Neo-classicism, as is the theatre (Théâtre municipal) (1846). The large Hop hall (Halle au houblon) is a good example of historicism in architecture. It was built by the French in 1867 and extended twice by the Germans, in 1881 and 1908.

The Basilica of Our Lady in the locality of Marienthal is a vast Gothic Revival sanctuary (1863–1866). It keeps two early 15th-century statues, and a host of sculptures from around 1519.

Haguenau's streets are adorned by attractive fountains, the medieval Saint-Georges fountain, the 18th-century Bee fountain (Fontaine aux abeilles) and the 1825 Dolphin fountain (Fontaine aux dauphins).

=== Museums ===
- Musée historique de Haguenau (Historical Museum). The largest museum in Bas-Rhin outside of Strasbourg, it is located in a grand neo-medieval building (1905).
- Musée alsacien (Haguenau) (Alsatian Museum). Located in the former palace of the chancellor (Chancellerie), Haguenau's main Renaissance building.
- Musée du bagage (Baggage museum). Located in a former 1840s villa that subsequently served as a bank. The museum opened in April 2016.

== Higher education ==
The Institut universitaire de technologie de Haguenau (IUT) was founded in 2006. It is a branch of the University of Strasbourg.

== Transport ==
Haguenau station offers rail connections to Strasbourg, Wissembourg and Niederbronn-les-Bains.

The nearest airports to Haguenau are:

- Karlsruhe/Baden-Baden Airport, located 39 km (24 mi) east
- Strasbourg Airport, located 48 km (30 mi) south
- Stuttgart Airport, located 138 km (86 mi) east
- EuroAirport Basel-Mulhouse-Freiburg, located 157 km (98 mi) south

== Notable people ==
- Thomas Anshelm (de)
- Werner Barkholt (1902–1942), a Catholic spiritualist
- Alfred von Beckerath (de)
- Charles Berdellé (fr)
- Stéphane Besle
- Philipp Biedert (de)
- Philipp Friedrich Böddecker (1607–1683), a Composer and organist
- David Léon Cahun (1841–1900), a Jewish French traveler, orientalist and writer
- Wolfgang Fabricius Capito(n) (Köpfel) (1478–1541), a Christian theologian and reformer
- Roger Corbeau (fr)
- Louis Eisenmann (de)
- Frederick Barbarossa, 21st Holy Roman Emperor (1152–1190)
- Albert Gemmrich
- Karl Gengler (1886–1974), a politician
- Gustave Glotz
- Heinrich Gran (active from 1489 until 1527), a printer of incunabula
- Heinrich von Isny (de)
- Josel of Rosheim (1476–1554), a Jewish shtadlan, born here
- Cédric Klein (fr)
- Diebold Lauber (de)
- Borach Levi, later Joseph Jean François Elie (1721–?), a Jewish convert to Christianity
- Eliezer Liebermann (half of the 19th-century), an Austrian Jewish Talmudist son of the rabbi Zeeb-Wolf of this town
- Sébastien Loeb (born 1974), 9-time World Rally Championship-winning driver
- Marcel Loeffler (fr)
- Adam Friedrich Löwenfinck (de)
- Niklaus von Hagenau
- Jean-Georges Paulus
- Reinmar of Hagenau, 12th-century minnesinger
- Marie-Louise Roth (born 1926), a literary scientist (de)
- Elie Scheid (1841–1922), a Jewish French communal worker and writer
- Diebold Schilling the Younger (before 1460, Haguenau (?)–1515 (?)), an Alsatian-Swiss chronicler
- Marius Schneider (fr)
- Elek Schwartz
- Theobald Schwarz (de)
- Pierre Seel (1923–2005), an activist
- Eduard Stadtler
- Johannes Stroux
- Peter Stühlen (de)
- Joseph Thierry
- Michel Walter (fr)
- Mathieu Weill (1851–1939), a Jewish French mathematician
- Serge Stresser (1953 - 2026), French weightlifter

== Twin towns ==
Haguenau is twinned with Landau (Germany).

== Media ==
Episode eight of the Second World War miniseries Band of Brothers is set in Haguenau.

In the 1968 film The Girl on a Motorcycle, Marianne Faithfull's character sets out from Haguenau on her fateful journey.

== See also ==
- Communes of the Bas-Rhin department
- Haguenau Airport
