= St. George's Church, Haguenau =

Coordinates: 48°48′49″N 7°47′13″E

- Église Saint-Georges de Haguenau
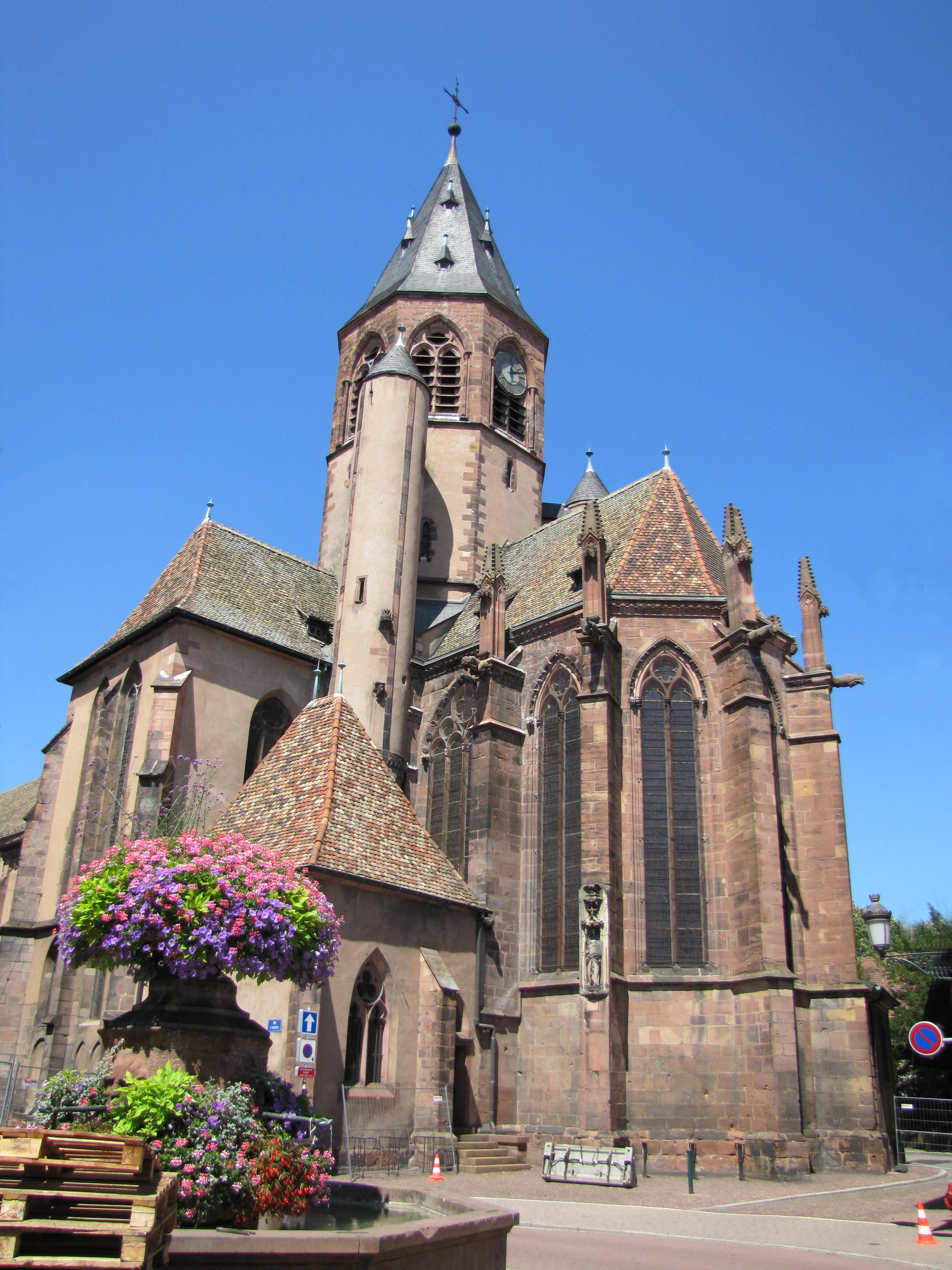
- St. George's Church, Haguenau
- Location: Haguenau
- Country: France
- Denomination: Roman Catholic Church

History
- Founded: 1143

Architecture
- Heritage designation: Monument historique
- Designated: 1848
- Style: Romanesque architecture Gothic architecture
- Completed: 1611

Specifications
- Length: 67 m (220 ft)
- Width: 22 m (72 ft)

Administration
- Archdiocese: Strasbourg

The Roman Catholic St. George's Church (French: Église Saint-Georges) is the most important religious building of the city of Haguenau in Alsace, France.

== Building history and description ==
A first church building, started in 1143, was replaced around 1200 by a flat-roofed basilica with columns, recalling the architecture of Hirsau Abbey and the influence of the Romanesque architecture of Swabia, rather than the Upper Rhine regions and Alsace where basilicas were predominantly domed. The exterior of the nave is divided by pilasters and archivolted friezes.

From 1250 to 1283, an expansion in Gothic style took place: a polygonal choir and transept and an octagonal crossing tower were added to the Romanesque nave, which remained intact, and the aisles were covered with a cross-ribbed vault. The nave vault was built only in 1609–1611 in Survival Gothic forms (see Jesuit Church, Molsheim).

During the French Revolution and the fighting around the city in 1945, the church suffered losses in construction and decoration material. Several severed sculptures, that initially decorated the Eastern part of the church, are kept today in the Musée historique de Haguenau. The church was restored by 1963.

Most noteworthy inside of the Church are the pulpit from the year 1500 by Veit Wagner, a huge crucifix (4 meters high, 2.75 meters wide) from the year 1488 by Klemens von Baden, a twelve-meter-high tabernacle from 1523 by Friedrich Hammer, and several carved altars, including a large-scale work by Diebold Martin, a Last Judgment, to which in the 19th century two late-Gothic paintings by a Franconian or Swabian Anonymous master were added, composing an altar which had originally not been designed in this form. The great pipe organ is made by Alfred Kern & Fils (1988) in a case of 1867 by the workshop of Eberhard Friedrich Walcker; however, there was already in the 15th century an organ documented in the building.

In 1845 the church received new stained glass windows depicting the Emperors Frederick Barbarossa, Konrad III, Rudolf von Habsburg, and Albert III, Duke of Austria. These windows did not survive the bombings of 1945. The windows to be seen today are the work of Jacques Le Chevallier, and were installed from 1956 to 1969.

The bell tower over the crossing and includes the two oldest active bells of Europe; both were cast in 1268 and survived World War II unscathed.

== Dimensions ==
The known dimensions are as follows:

- External length: 67 m (220 ft)
- External width: 22 m (72 ft)
- Internal length: 61 m (200 ft)
- Internal width: 19.6 m (64 ft)

== Views ==
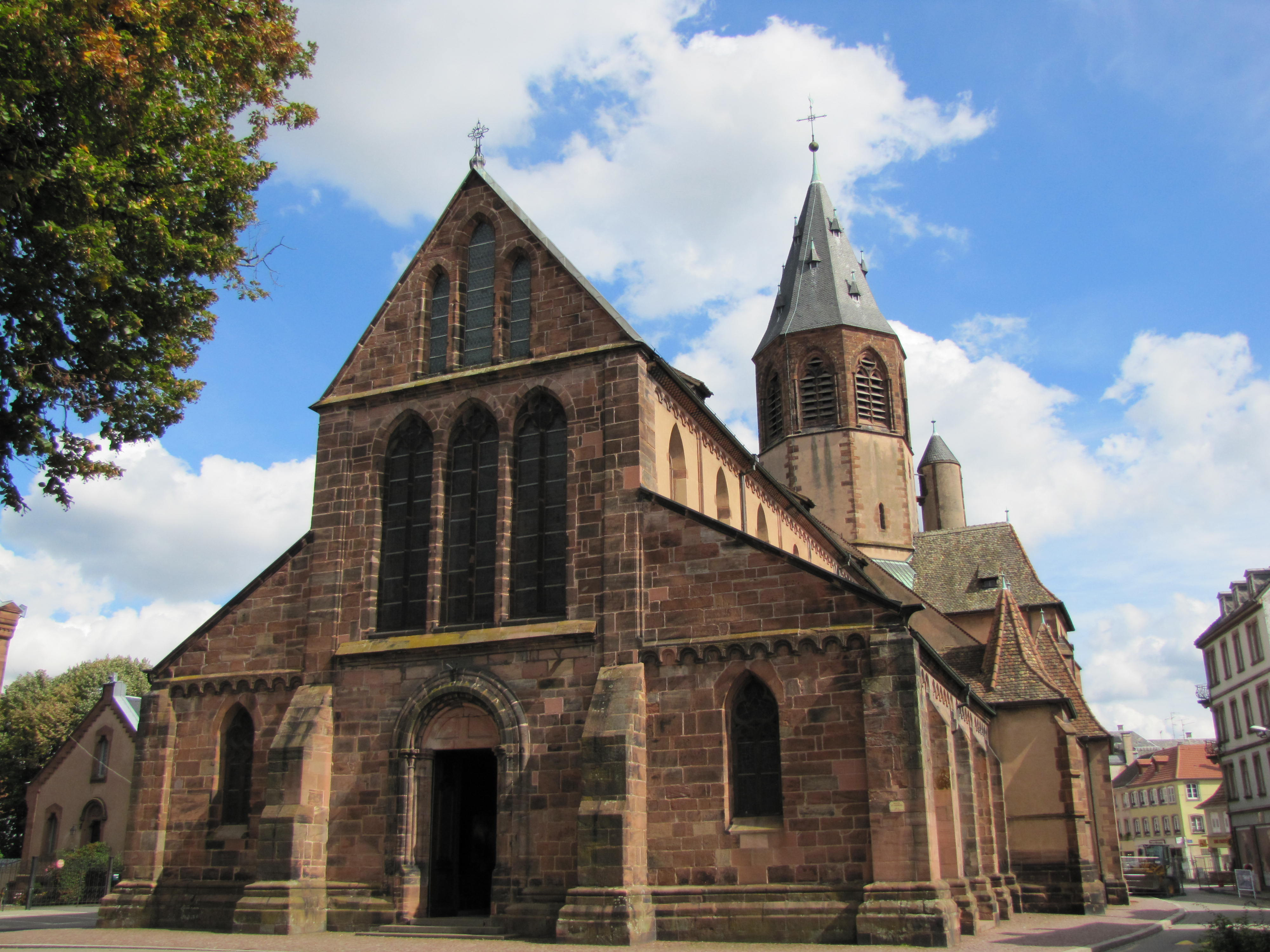
West façade of St. George's

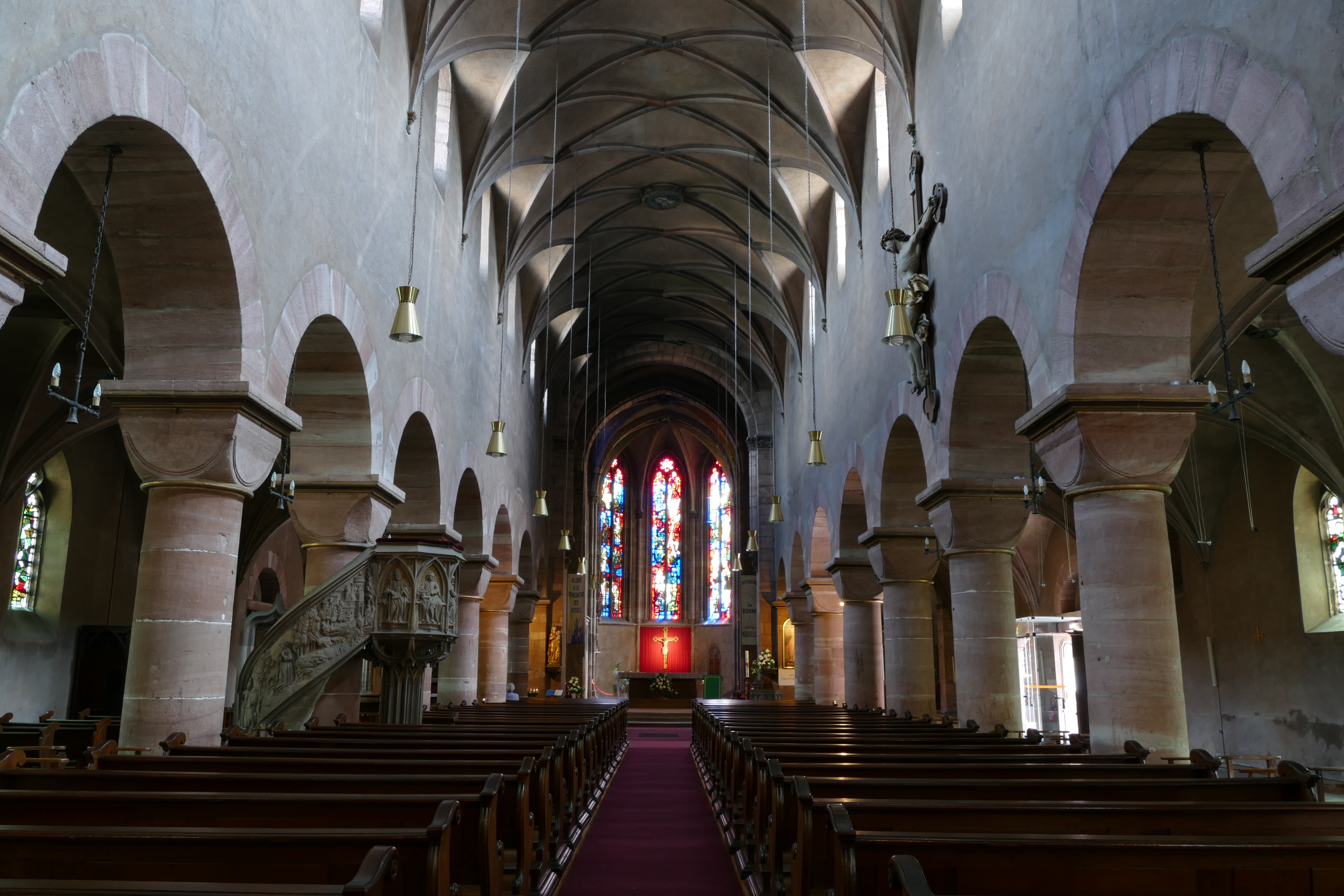
View to the East with choir

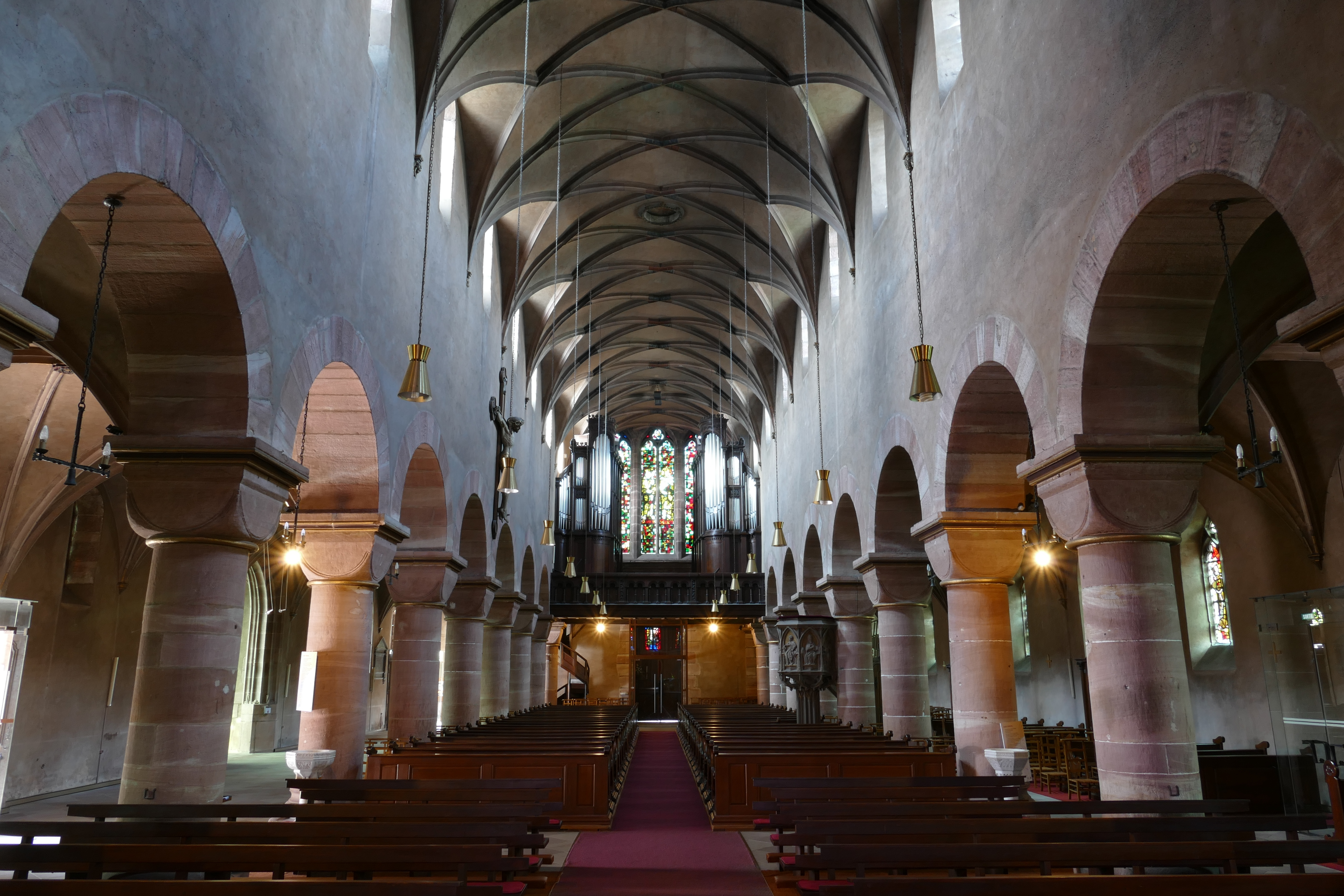
View to the West with pipe organ

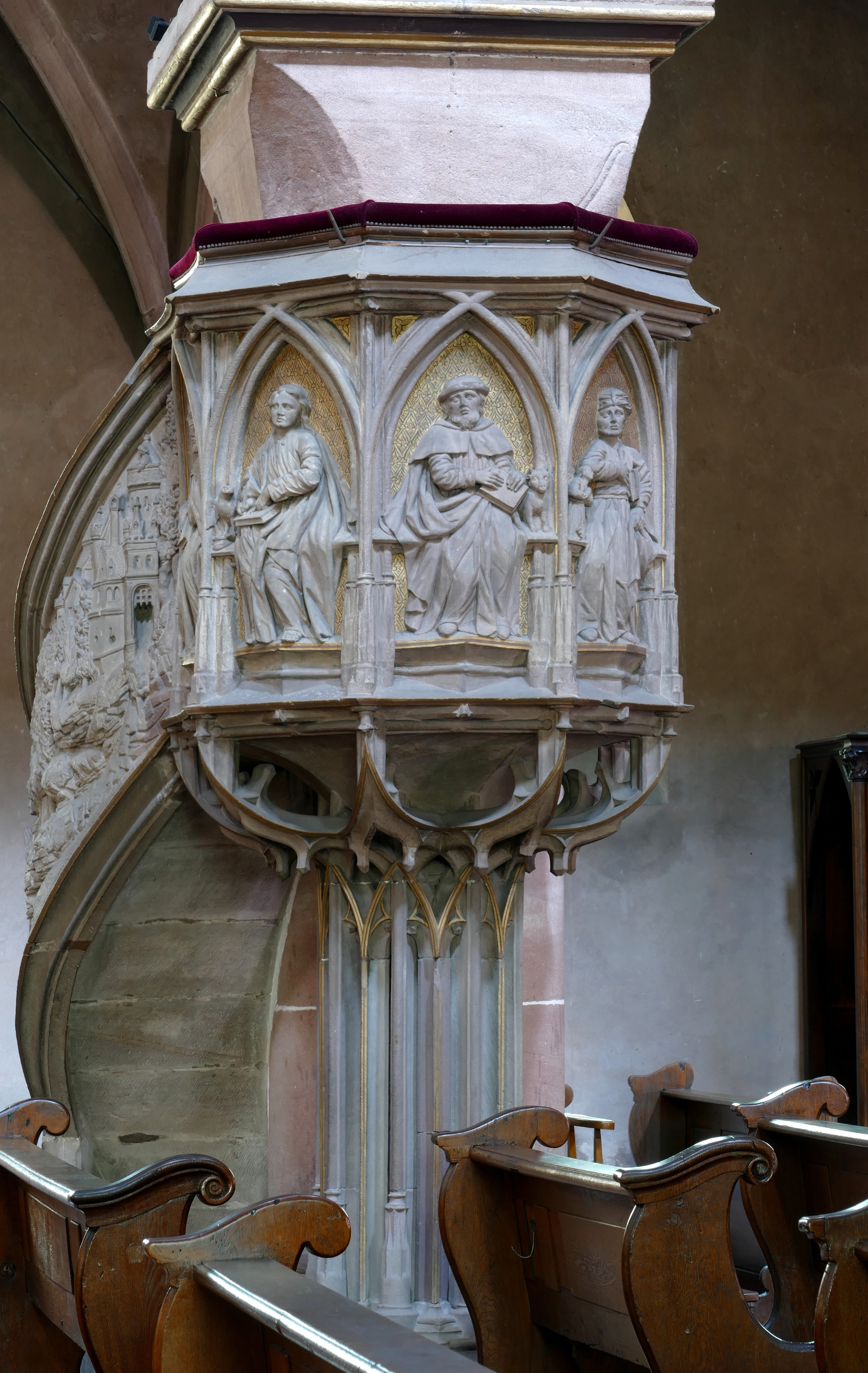
The pulpit

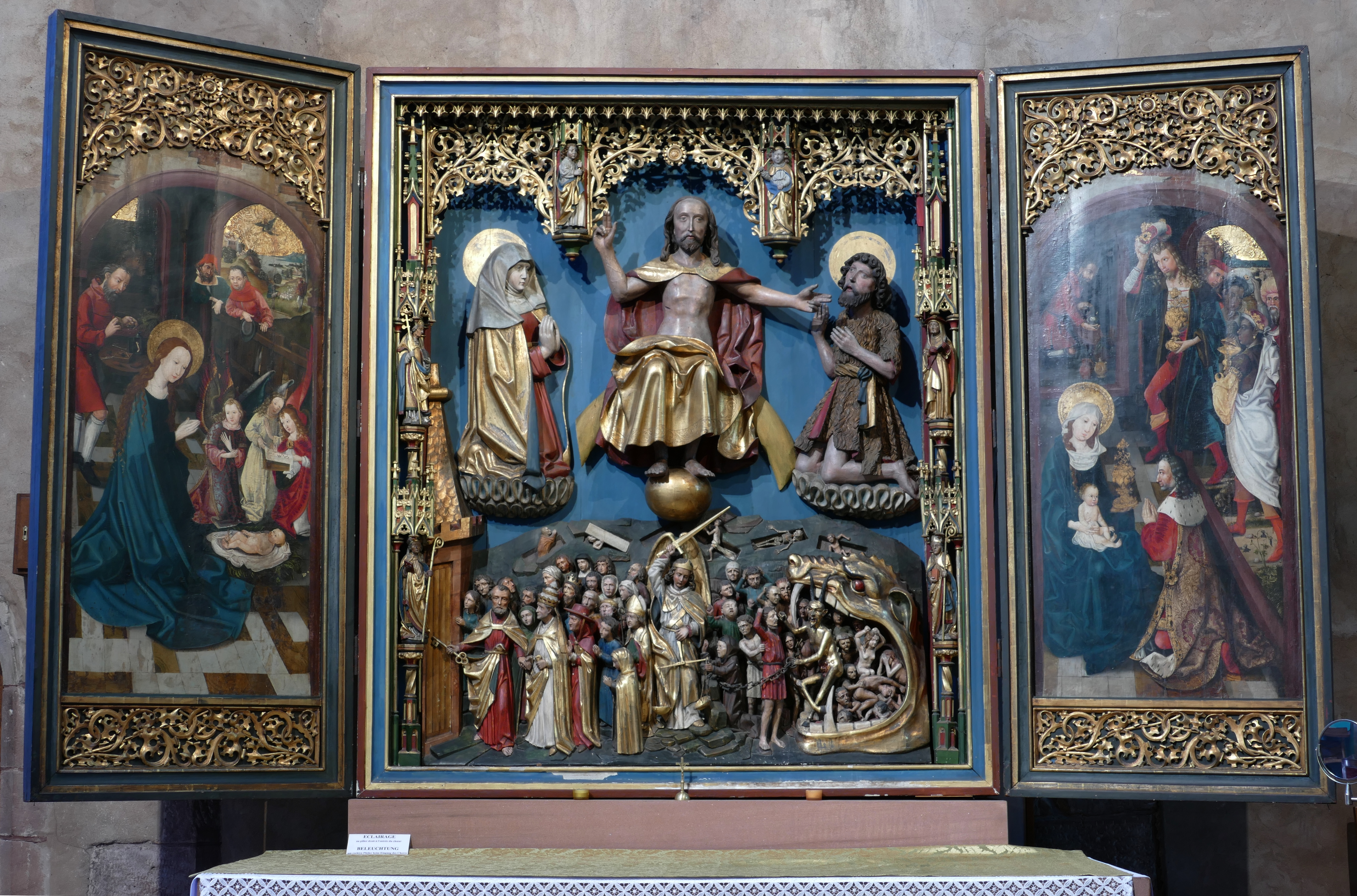
The "Judgement Day" altarpiece

== See also ==
- List of Jesuit sites

== Literature ==
- Ernst Adam: Baukunst der Stauferzeit in Baden-Württemberg und im Elsaß. Stuttgart and Aalen 1977th
