= Ancienne Douane, Haguenau =

Ancienne Douane
- Alsatian: Kaufhus
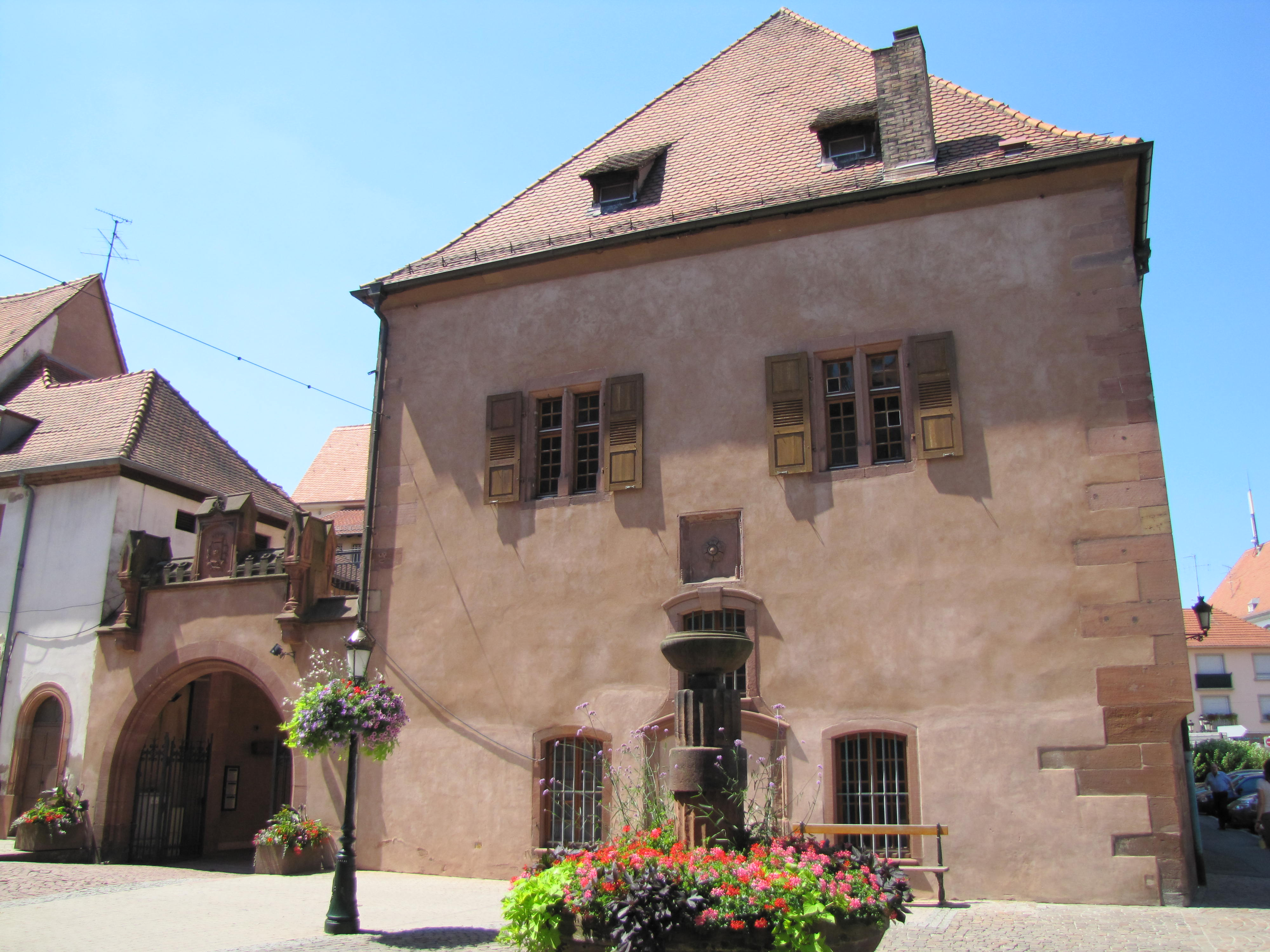
- East side of Ancienne Douane in 2010
- Interactive map of the Ancienne Douane area
- Alternative names: German: Kaufhaus

General information
- Type: customs house
- Architectural style: Renaissance; Renaissance Revival
- Location: Haguenau, France, 16, Place d'Armes
- Coordinates: 48°48′54.60″N 7°47′21″E
- Construction started: 1515
- Completed: 1518
- Renovated: 1681; 1890s–1900s
- Destroyed: 1677
- Owner: Municipality of Haguenau

Design and construction
- Architect: Charles Stoll (1890s)

Ancienne Douane ("Old Custom house") is a Renaissance and Renaissance Revival building in Haguenau, France. It originally stood at the entrance of the town.

The building was built in 1515–1518 but heavily damaged in 1677, during the military campaign of Louis XIV against the Décapole. It was restored in 1681. In the 1890s, the municipal architect, Charles Stoll, transformed the large room on the first floor in a festivity hall (salle des fêtes). In the 20th century, the exterior of the building was adorned with sculptures by Albert Schultz (1871–1953) and two portals were added in the Neo-Renaissance style. The Ancienne Douane was damaged again during World War II. It was rebuilt using elements from other destroyed buildings.

The ground floor of the Ancienne Douane houses a restaurant.
