= Cretan school =

Style of Greek religious painting during the Renaissance

The Cretan school describes an important school of icon painting, under the umbrella of post-Byzantine art, which flourished while Crete was under Venetian rule during the late Middle Ages, reaching its climax after the fall of Constantinople, becoming the central force in Greek painting during the 15th, 16th, and 17th centuries. The Cretan artists developed a particular style of painting under the influence of both Eastern and Western artistic traditions and movements; the most famous product of the school, El Greco, was the most successful of the many artists who tried to build a career in Western Europe, and also the one who left the Byzantine style farthest behind him in his later career.

Early painters from Crete included Nikolaos Philanthropinos 1380–1450, Ioannis Pagomenos 1285–1340 and Manuel Fokas. Philanthropinos completed some mosaics in Venice, Italy at St Mark's Basilica in the 1430s. The fathers of the Cretan school are considered Angelos Akotantos, Andreas Pavias and Andreas Ritzos. Some of their works include: Saint Anne with the Virgin, The Virgin Pantanassa and The Crucifixion. Between 1454 and 1526, Crete was saturated with painting workshops, and the number of painters exceeded 145. Some painters, such as Nikolaos Gripiotis, produced mass quantities of unsigned icons for Italian and Greek patrons during the period, while other painters chose to sign their works.

Angelos Pitzamanos and Donatos Pitzamanos traveled to Italy, fusing the Cretan style with the School of Otranto in the late 1400s and early 1500s. A popular work completed by Angelos was Madonna of Constantinople. By the mid-1500s, Michael Damaskinos and Georgios Klontzas dominated the century with their incredible works. Some of Damaskinos' works were: Wedding at Cana , Madonna del Rosario, and Beheading of John the Baptist. Some of Klontzas' works were: In Thee Rejoiceth , Triptych of the Last Judgement, and Saint Catherine's Engagement. Both of the painters flourished around the time of El Greco, while Klontzas was recorded assessing one of his works. Another notable painter of the same era was Thomas Bathas, who maintained the Miraculous Icon of the Virgin Mary at St Mark's Basilica but also painted his own version entitled Virgin Nikopoios.

His student Emmanuel Tzanfournaris was part of the late Cretan school, and he completed the Virgin of the Passion. The late Cretan school included painters from the 1600s such as Elias Moskos, Emmanuel Tzanes, and Theodore Poulakis. Some of their works included: Jacob's Ladder, Saint Onuphrius and Noah's Ark . Most painters of the Cretan school began to migrate to the Ionian Islands and Venice during the war with the Ottoman Empire, and the late Cretan school shares characteristics with the Heptanese school of painting.

Flemish engravings were introduced to Greek paintings during the middle part of the 1600s, one of the earliest works was completed by Georgios Markazinis integrating Flemish engravings with the Creto-Venetian style known as The Crucifixion. Poulakis' Noah's Ark also emulated engravings. The Greek painters living in Crete dropped from 156 between 1527-1630 to 68 between 1631-1700. While some painters remained, most of them migrated to the Ionian Islands. The last period, from 1700 to 1820, saw 52 Greek painters active in Crete during the Ottoman occupation. Some included: Georgios Kastrofylakas, Michael Prevelis and Ioannis Kornaros. One of Kornaros notable works includes: Catherine of Alexandria.

== 15th century ==
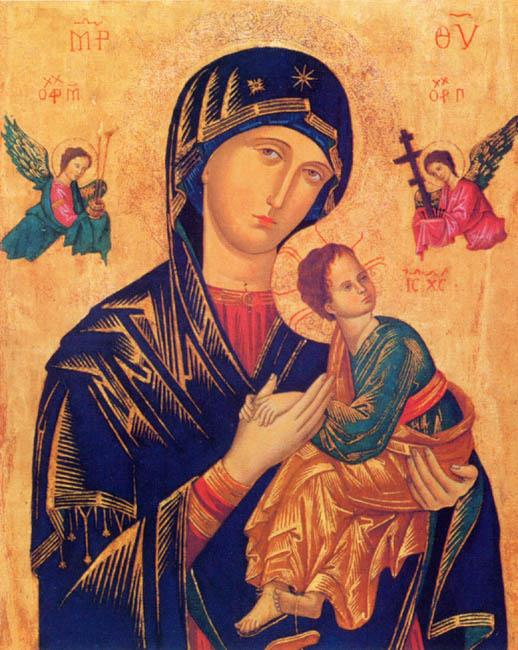
Our Lady of Perpetual Help, probably an early Cretan work of 13th or 14th century

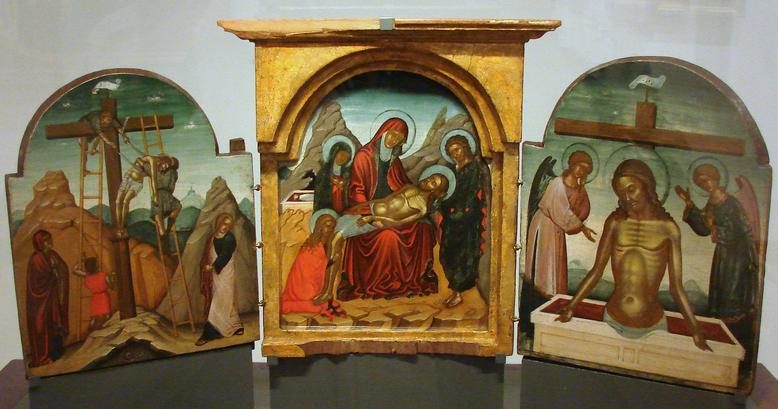
Deposition, Lamentation and Resurrection triptych by Nikolaos Zafouris, c. 1490s (National Museum, Warsaw)

There was a substantial demand for Byzantine icons in Europe throughout the Middle Ages and, as a Venetian possession since 1204, Crete had a natural advantage and soon came to dominate the supply. A probable early example is the famous icon of the Virgin in Rome known as Our Mother of Perpetual Help, which was certainly well known in Rome by 1499. At this date there is little to distinguish Cretan work from other Byzantine icons stylistically, and the quality of work is lower than that associated with Constantinople.

This period also saw considerable numbers of wall-paintings in local churches and monasteries – altogether some 850 from the 14th and 15th centuries survive in Crete, far more than from earlier or later periods.

By the late 15th century, Cretan artists had established a distinct icon-painting style, distinguished by "the precise outlines, the modelling of the flesh with dark brown underpaint and dense tiny highlights on the cheeks of the faces, the bright colours in the garments, the geometrical treatment of the drapery, and, finally the balanced articulation of the composition", or "sharp contours, slim silhouettes, linear draperies and restrained movements". The most famous artist of the period was Andreas Ritzos (c. 1421–1492), whose son Nicholas was also well known. Angelos Akotantos, until recently thought to be a conservative painter of the 17th century, is now, after the discovery of a will dated 1436, seen to have been an innovative artist in fusing Byzantine and Western styles, who survived until about 1457, when the will was actually registered. The will was made in anticipation of a voyage to Constantinople; several icons were bequeathed to church institutions, some Catholic but mainly Orthodox, and the disposition of his stock of pattern drawings was carefully specified. Andreas Pavias (d. after 1504) and his pupil Angelos Bizamanos, and Nicholas Tzafuris (d. before 1501) were other leading artists.

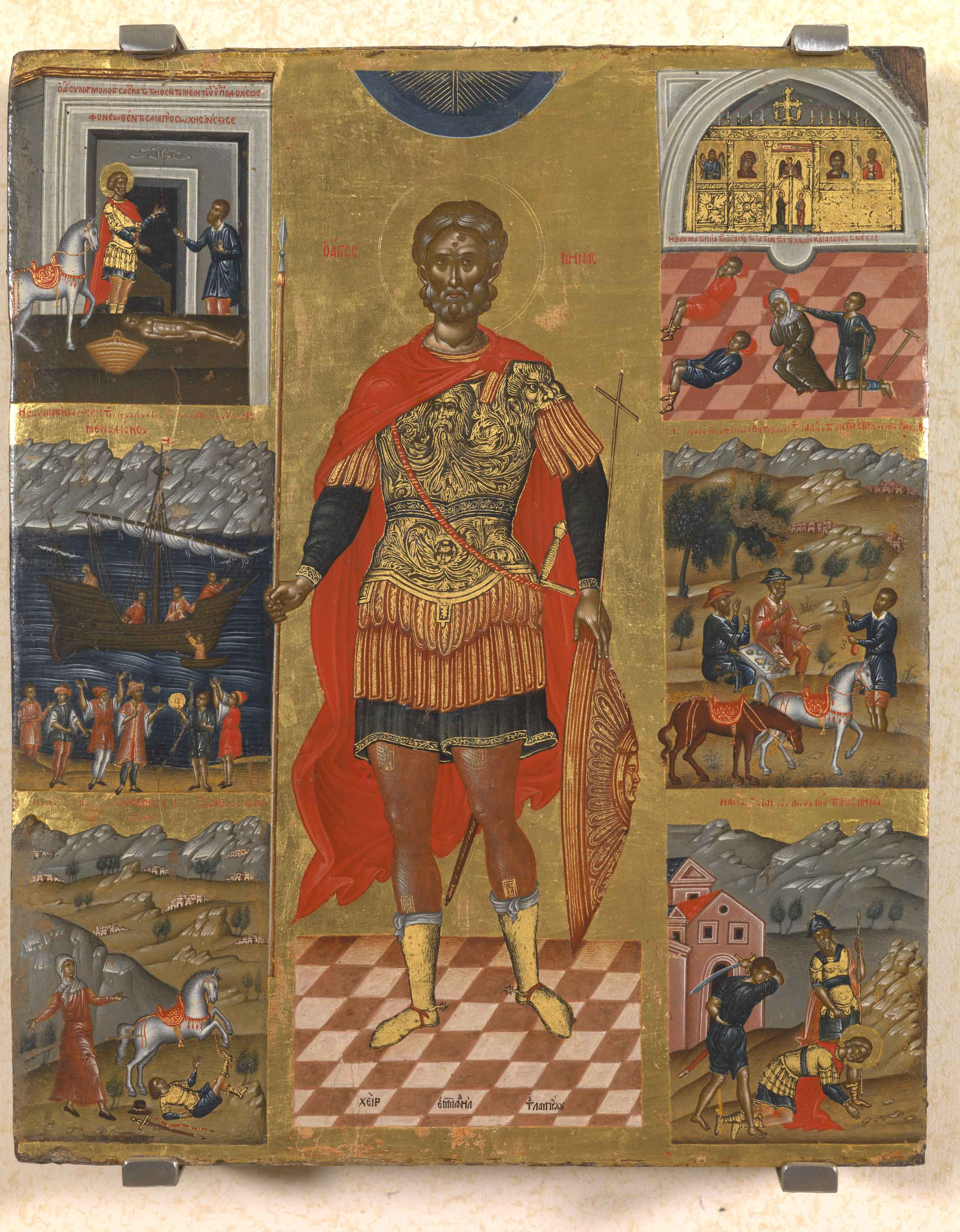
Saint Menas by Emmanuel Lambardos (17th century)

Even before the fall of Constantinople there is evidence that leading Byzantine artists were leaving the capital in order to settle in Crete. The migration of Byzantine artists to Crete continued increasingly during the following years and reached its peak after the fall of Constantinople in 1453, when Crete became "the most important centre of art in the Greek world", influencing artistic developments in the rest of the Greek world. Cretan icons were commissioned for monasteries on Mount Athos and elsewhere. Until it fell to the Turks in 1522, the Cretan school was rivalled by the smaller and less significant community of artists in Rhodes. The Venetian archives preserve considerable documentation on the trade of artistic icons between Venice and Crete, which by the end of the 15th century had become one of mass production. There is documentation of a specific order in 1499, of 700 icons of the Virgin, 500 in a Western style, and 200 in Byzantine style. The order was placed with three artists by two dealers, one Venetian and one from mainland Greece, and the time between contract date and delivery was set at only forty-five days. Probably the quality of many such commissioned icons was fairly low, and the dismissive term Madonneri was devised to describe such bulk painters, who later practiced in Italy also, often using a quasi-Byzantine style, and apparently often Greek or Dalmatian individuals. Production of icons at these levels seems to have led to a glut in the market, and in the following two decades there is much evidence that the Cretan trade declined significantly, as the European demand had been reduced. But at the top end of the market Cretan icons were now the finest in the Byzantine world.

== 16th century ==
Works by El Greco

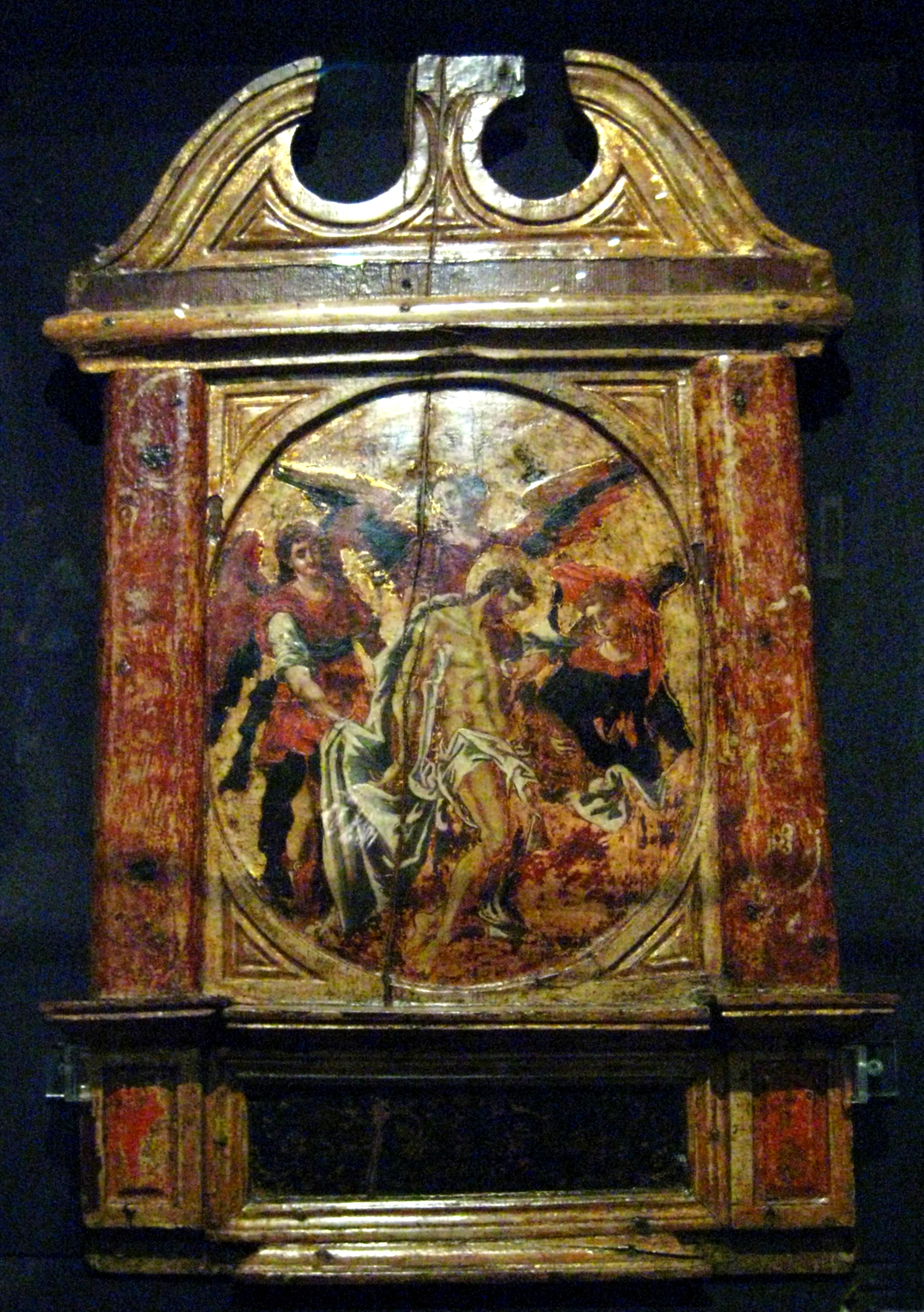
Pietà (1566), Benaki Museum

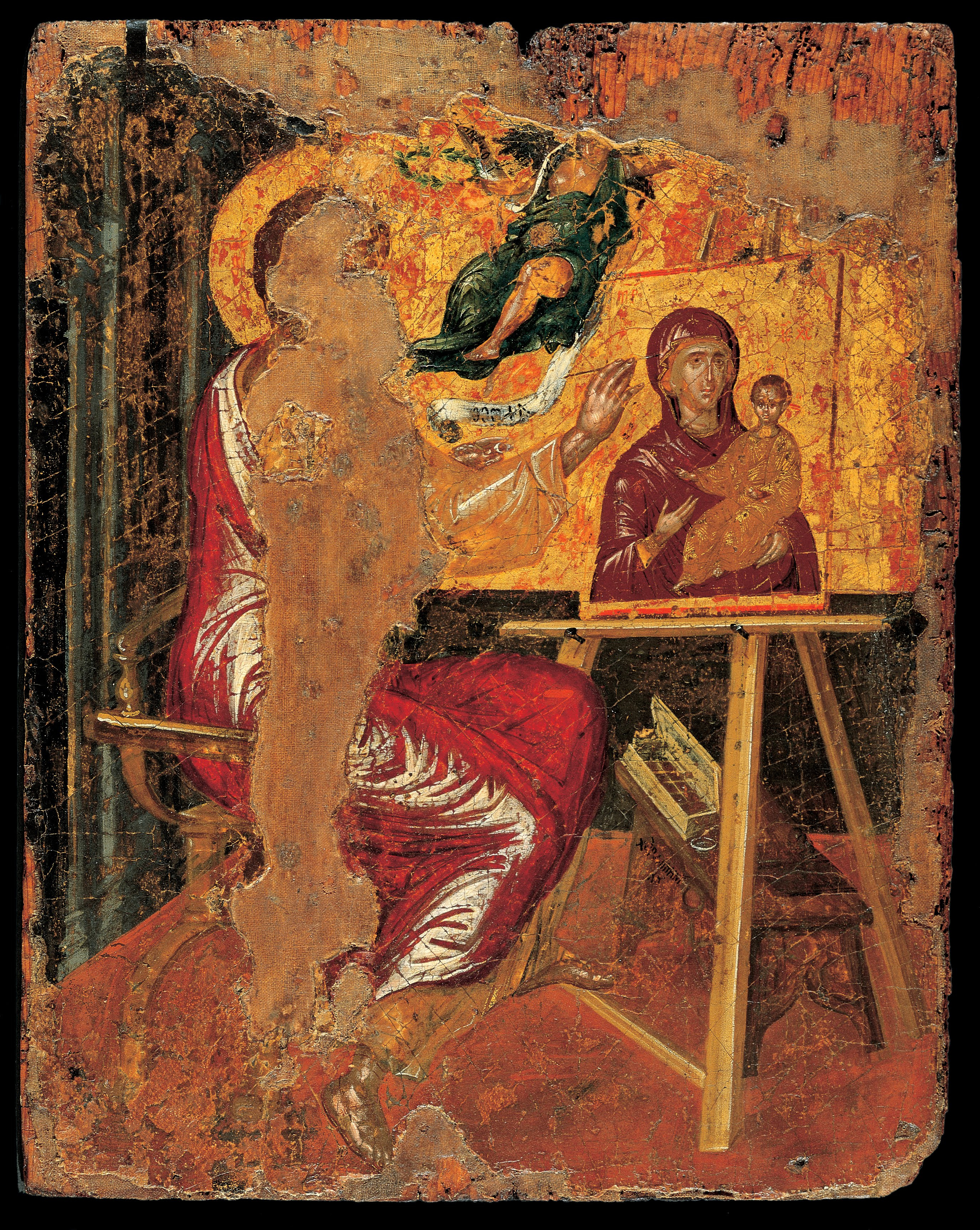
Saint Luke Painting the Virgin (1560–1567), Benaki Museum

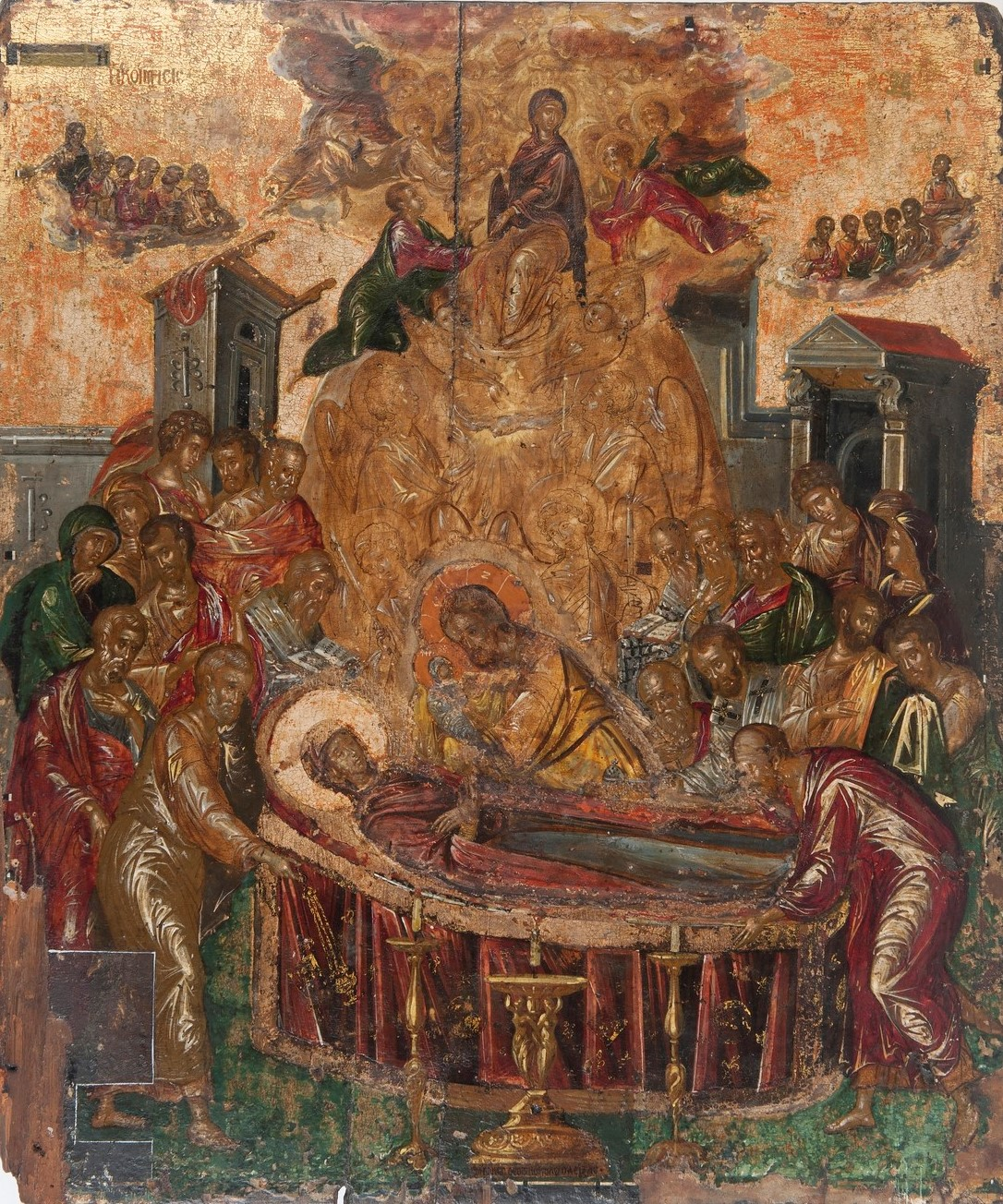
Dormition of the Virgin (before 1567), Ermoupoli

About 120 artists can be documented working in Candia (the Venetian name of Chandax, present day Herakleion), in the period 1453–1526, and they had organized a Schuola di San Luca painter's guild, based on the Italian model. The blending of the Eastern and the Western traditions, and a relaxed interchange between Greek Orthodox and Roman Catholic rites led to the "Cretan Renaissance", a golden period for the arts on the island, where both literature and painting flourished. Some of these painters chose to continue the Byzantine tradition of Constantinople, while others were influenced by the masters of the Venetian Renaissance, such as Giovanni Bellini and Titian. Later, Paolo Veronese was to be a particular influence. Works by these masters or copies were in monasteries and churches of the island, while examples of early Netherlandish painting decorated the Catholic churches of Candia or were to be found in the private collections of rich Venetians and Greeks. In particular, Candia contained a large Franciscan church and a large Orthodox monastery, a daughter-house of Saint Catherine's Monastery, both of which had strong collections from their respective traditions.

Contemporary documents refer to two styles in painting: the maniera greca (alla greca, in line with the Byzantine idiom) and the maniera Latina (alla Latina, in accordance with Western techniques), which artists knew and utilized according to the circumstances; as a result some kind of "eclecticism" appeared. Indeed, sometimes both styles could be found in the same icon, the one right next to the other. The fame of the most prominent Cretan painters spread throughout Greece, the Mediterranean and Europe. After the beginning of the 16th century, the Cretan artists once again had more commissions and their works were avidly sought, since they had started to use new motives and to adjust their iconography to the new trends of their era. To an extent quantity was probably replaced by quality compared with the previous century.

=== 16th-century artists ===
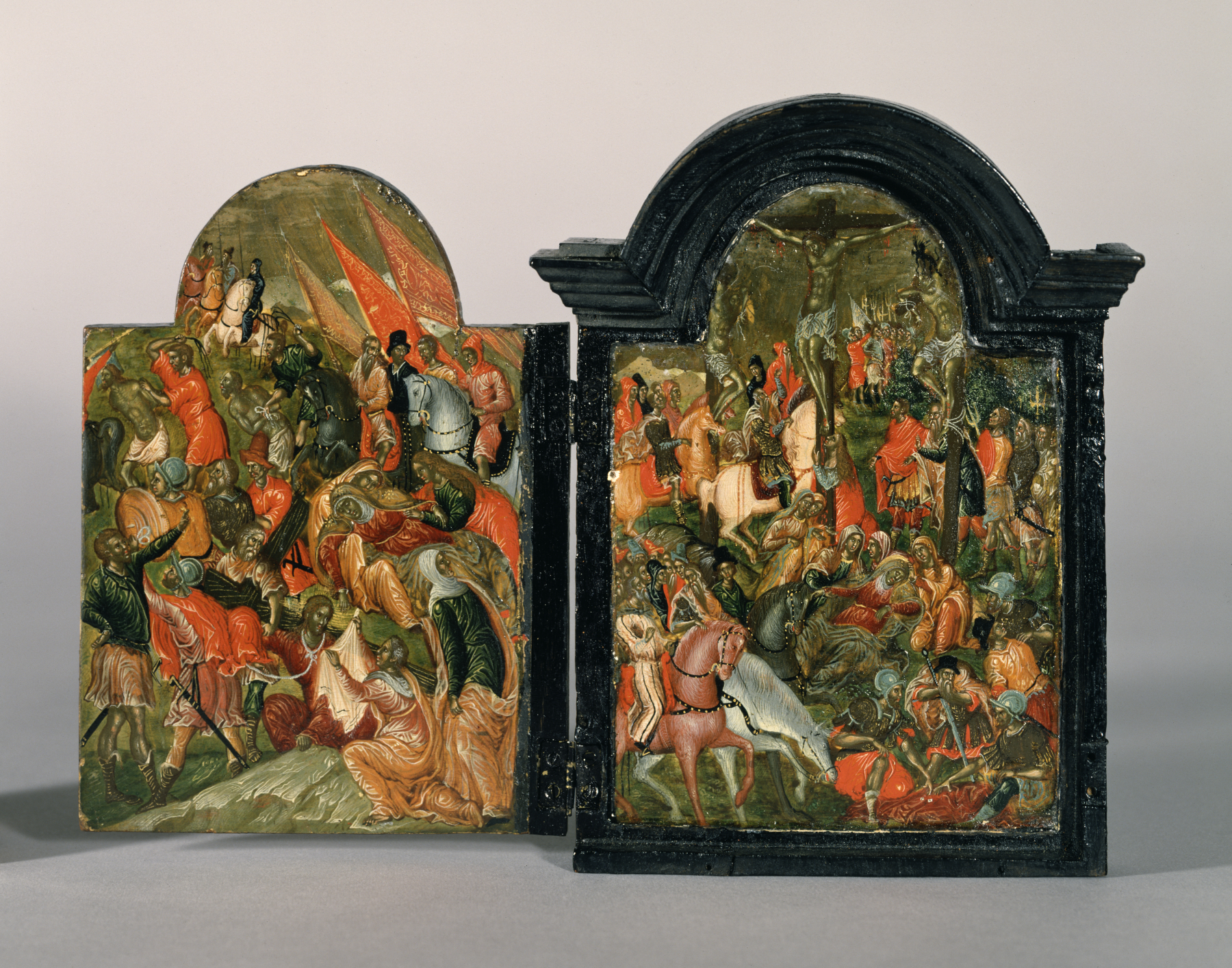
Scenes of Christ's Passion triptych by Georgios Klontzas (the right wing is lost)

Apart from El Greco, the most famous Cretan artists during the century were Theophanis Strelitzas (Θεοφάνης Στρελίτζας), known as Theophanes the Cretan, Michael Damaskenos (Μιχαήλ Δαμασκηνός), and Georgios Klontzas (Γεώργιος Κλόντζας). Various members of the Lambardos family were also significant artists. Fortunately for art historians, many Cretan painters adopted the practice, perhaps as early as Western painters, of signing their work, which was not a traditional Byzantine practice.

Theophanes the Cretan was a relatively conservative Cretan artist, whose first dated work is from 1527, and all of whose known works were done on the mainland or smaller islands. He was the most important Greek wall painter of his day, incorporating some Western iconographic and stylistic elements, but remaining essentially Byzantine in spirit.

The intellectual and artistic personality of the young El Greco was formed in this artistic environment. In 1563, at the age of twenty-two, El Greco was described in a document as a "master" ("maestro Domenigo"), meaning he was already an enrolled master of the local guild, presumably in charge of his own workshop. He left for Venice a few years later, and never returned to Crete. His Dormition of the Virgin, of before 1567 in tempera and gold on panel (61.4 × 45 cm, Holy Cathedral of the Dormition of the Virgin, Hermoupolis, Syros) was probably created near the end of El Greco's Cretan period. The painting combines post-Byzantine and Italian Mannerist stylistic and iconographic elements, and incorporates stylistic elements of the Cretan school.

Styles in the work of Michael Damaskenos

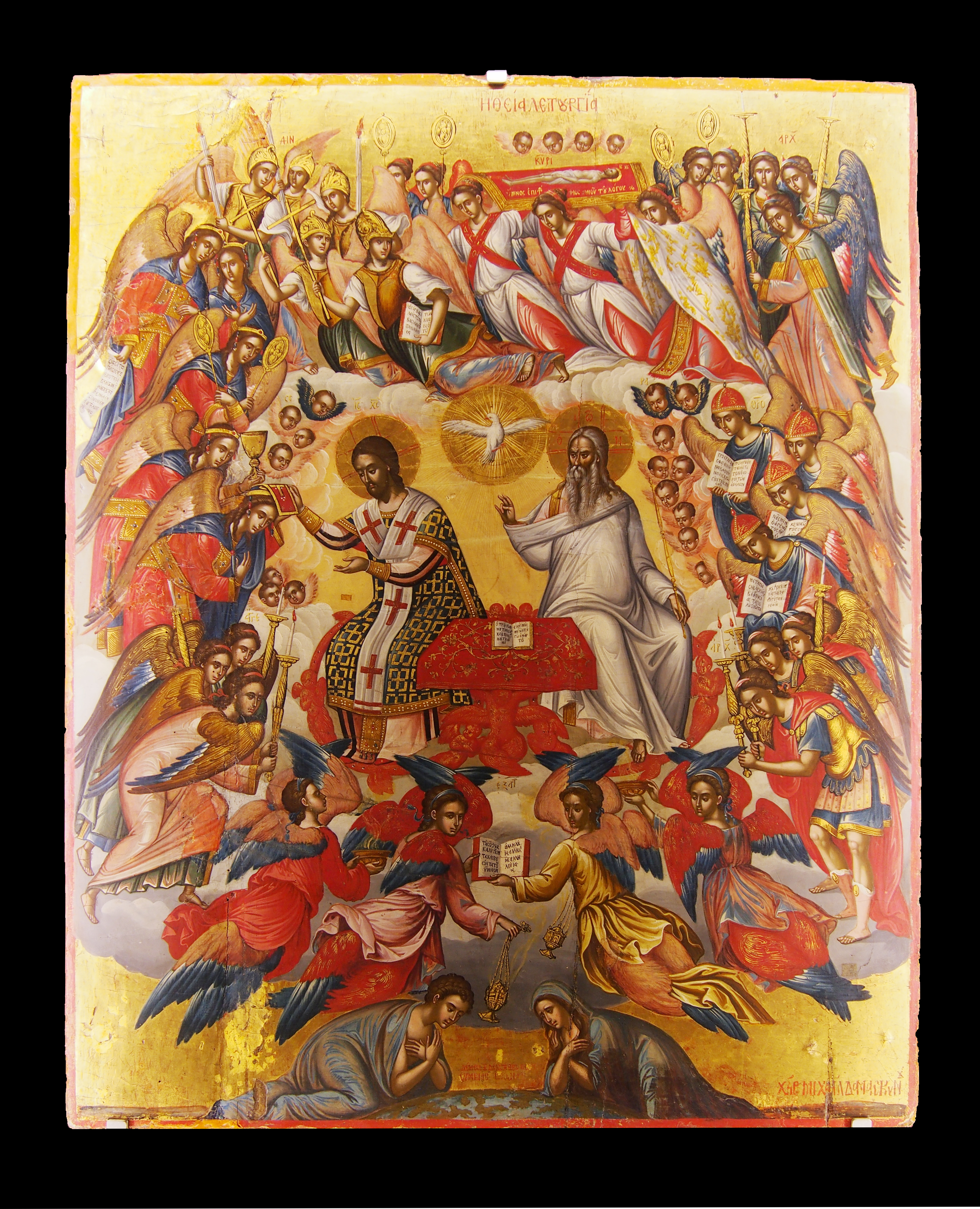
Holy Liturgy, an Orthodox composition, though showing Western stylistic and iconographic influence, for example in depicting God the Father

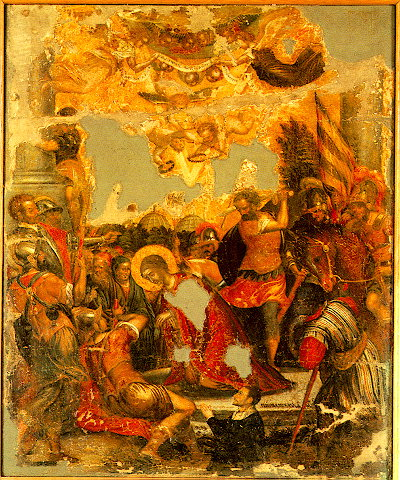
Decapitation of Agia Paraskevi, conceived in Venetian style

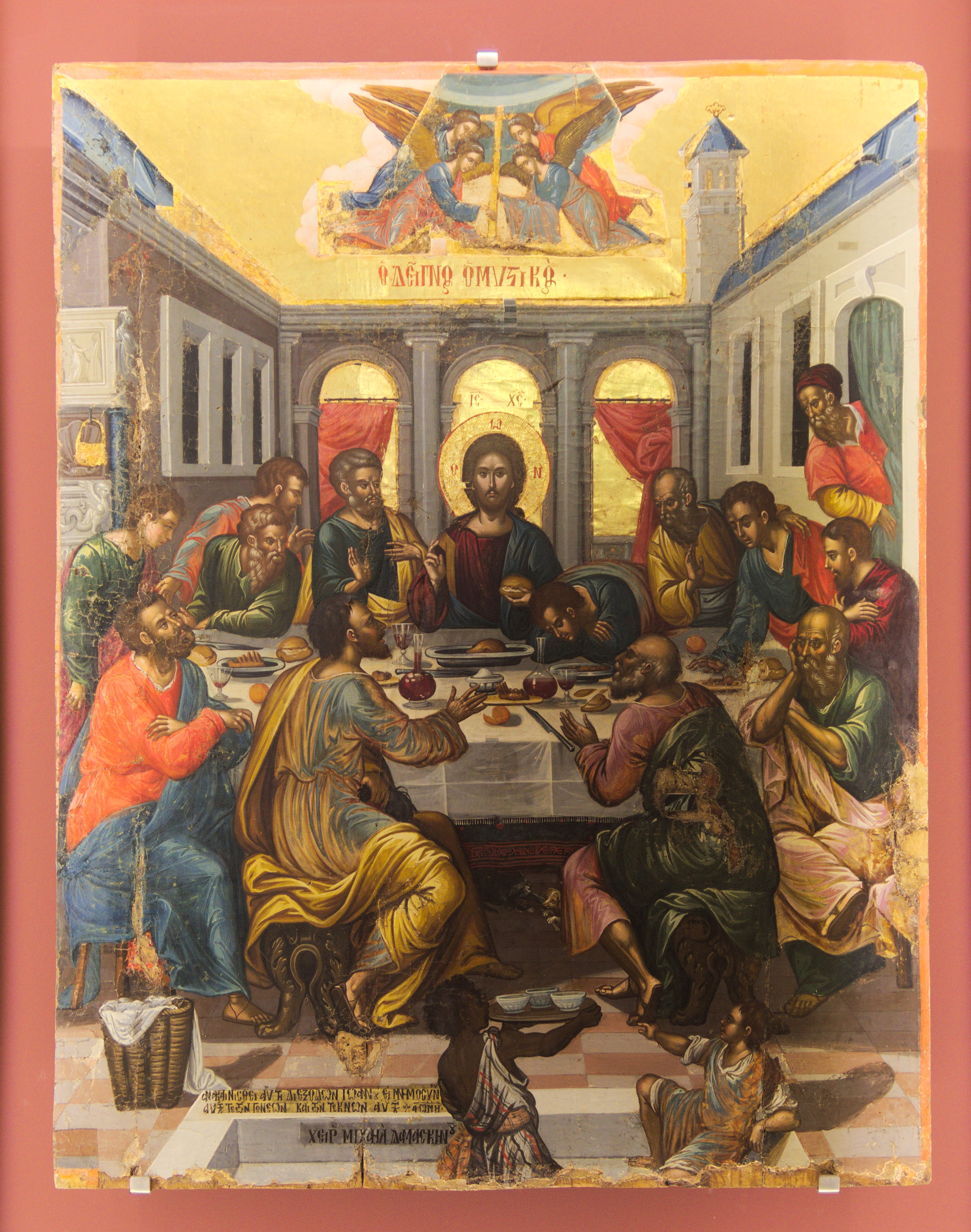
Last Supper

During the second half of the 16th century, many Cretan artists went to Venice, in the hope of gaining commissions and recognition. Unlike El Greco, the other Cretan painters who moved there did not substantially alter their styles or working methods. They simply incorporated more Italian motifs into a consistent Byzantine framework. Jonathan Brown provides a perceptive analysis of the ways that El Greco distinguished himself from other Cretan artists active in Venice, while Richard Mann argues that "none of these painters accepted Renaissance ideas about the relevance of change to the creation of art works". Michael Damaskenos returned to Crete after three years, and remained there for the rest of his life.

== 17th century ==
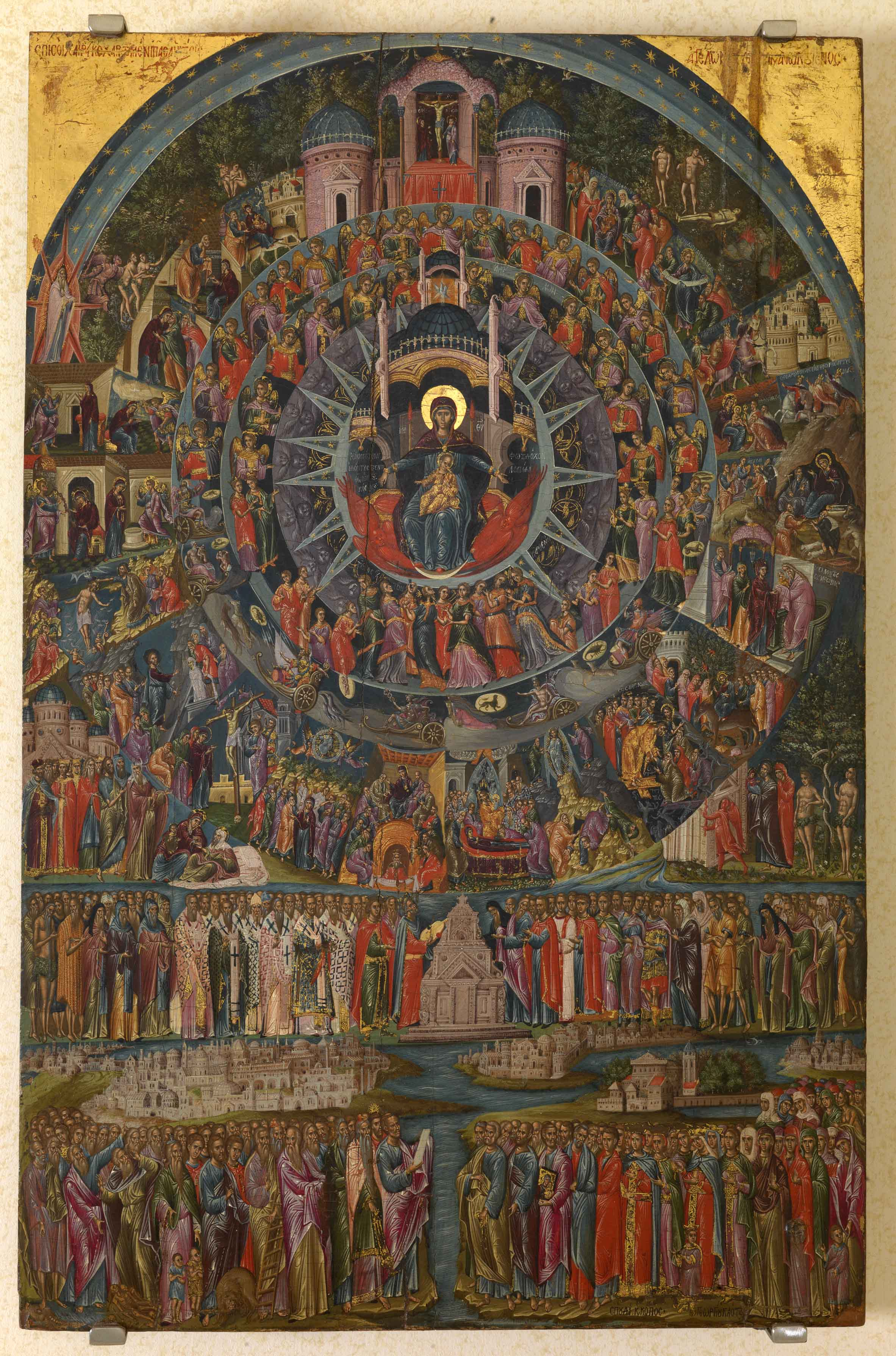
In Thee Rejoiceth
Georgios Klontzas (1530–1608)

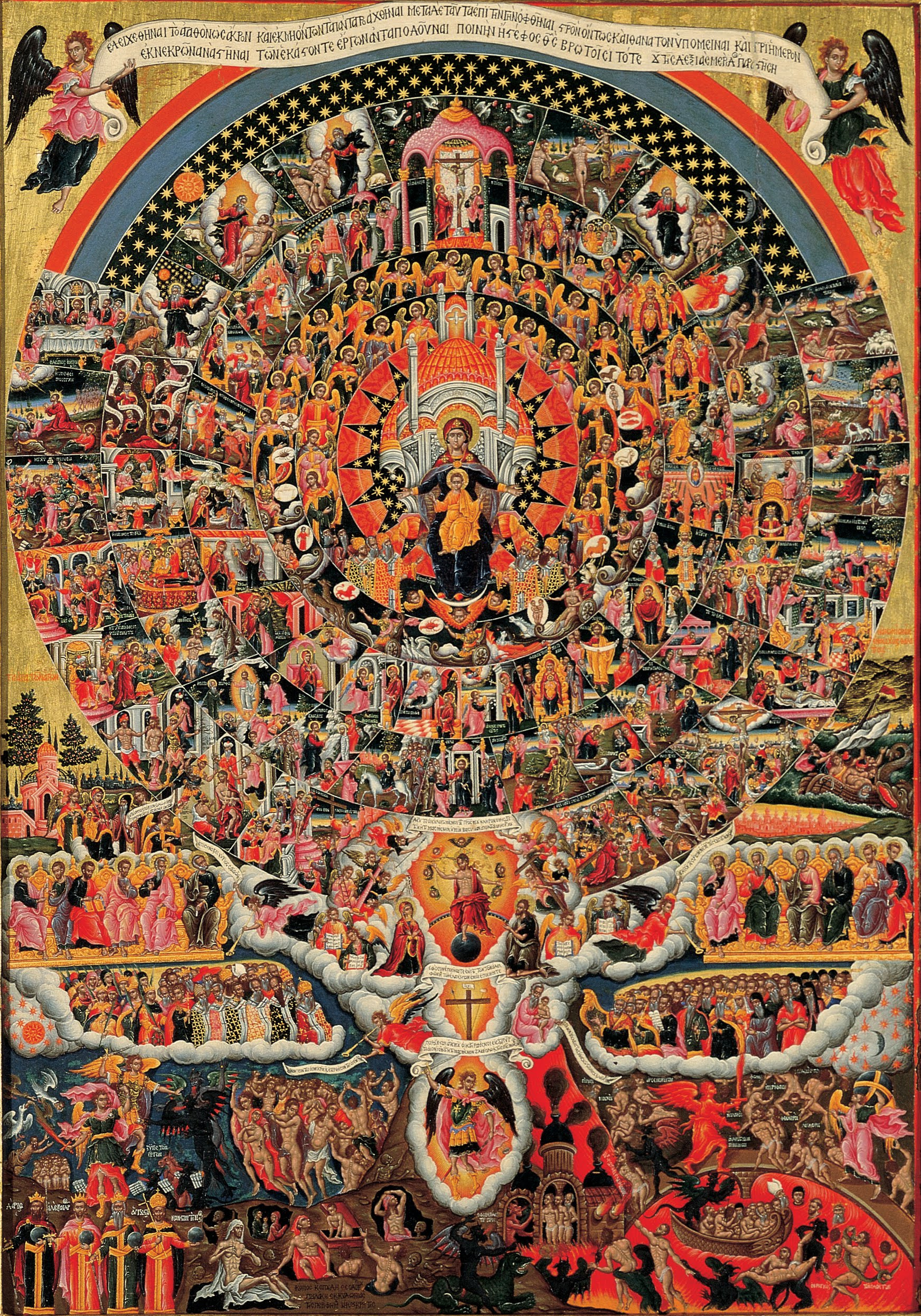
In Thee Rejoiceth
Theodore Poulakis (1622–1692)

The 1600s were characterized as the final period of the Cretan school. The movement featured many artists. The late Cretan school was characterized by prototypes set forth by Michael Damaskinos and Georgios Klontzas. During that period Damaskinos's Beheading of John the Baptist and the Stoning of Stephen were copied by countless Cretan artists. Some included Philotheos Skoufos. Georgios Klontzas was another Cretan painter copied by many artists of the late Cretan school. Both his In Thee Rejoiceth and his The Last Judgment set the standard for painters of the late Cretan school. Theodore Poulakis was a prominent member of the late Cretan school. His version of Klontzas's painting was also called In Thee Rejoiceth. Both paintings are very similar. Many other painters also created their own version of Klontzas's In Thee Rejoiceth.

The Last Judgement was covered by artists of the Greek-Italian Byzantine style. Klontzas created his own unique version of the painting. Klontzas's Last Judgment was copied by artists of the late Cretan school. Notable versions include Moskos's Last Judgment and Kavertzas's Last Judgment.

One of the most important artistic advancements of the late Cretan school was the work of Ieremias Palladas, a Sinaitic monk. His painting of Saint Catherine of Alexandria, in Saint Catherine's Monastery, was copied by numerous contemporary artists and has served as a prototype for the depiction of the saint into modern times. Painters of the late Cretan school also created their own version of the Crucifixion. Notable version were Ioannis Moskos's Crucifixion and Georgios Markazinis's Crucifixion.

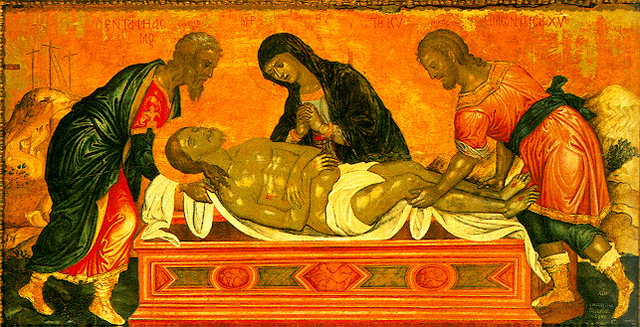
Icon by Emmanuel Tzanes (Paul and Alexandra Kanellopoulos Museum, Athens)

Another major representative of the Cretan school during the 17th century was famous Greek painter Emmanuel Tzanes, 130 of his works survived. Cretan icon painters continued to flourish, until the mid-century. Venetian art was not the only influence of the Cretan school. The late Cretan school was characterized by the influence of flemish engravings namely that of engraver Jan Sadeler I. Sadeler had a workshop in Venice. His work influenced Konstantinos Tzanes and Georgios Markazinis.

The Ottoman Turks occupied all the island except for Candia, which finally fell after twenty years of siege in 1669. After the Ottoman occupation of Crete, the centre of Greek painting moved to the Ionian Islands, which remained under Venetian rule until the Napoleonic Wars. A new artistic movement was created called the Heptanese school which was mostly influenced by Western European artistic trends. Many Cretan artists migrated to the Heptanese or Western Europe to enjoy the artistic freedom. Few artists continued to flourish in Crete after the occupation. Some of them were Michael Prevelis, Ioannis Kornaros and Georgios Kastrofylakas. A successive occupation of the Ionian islands by the French and the British allowed the Heptanese to remain the centre of Greek art until the independence of Greece in 1830.

== Research ==
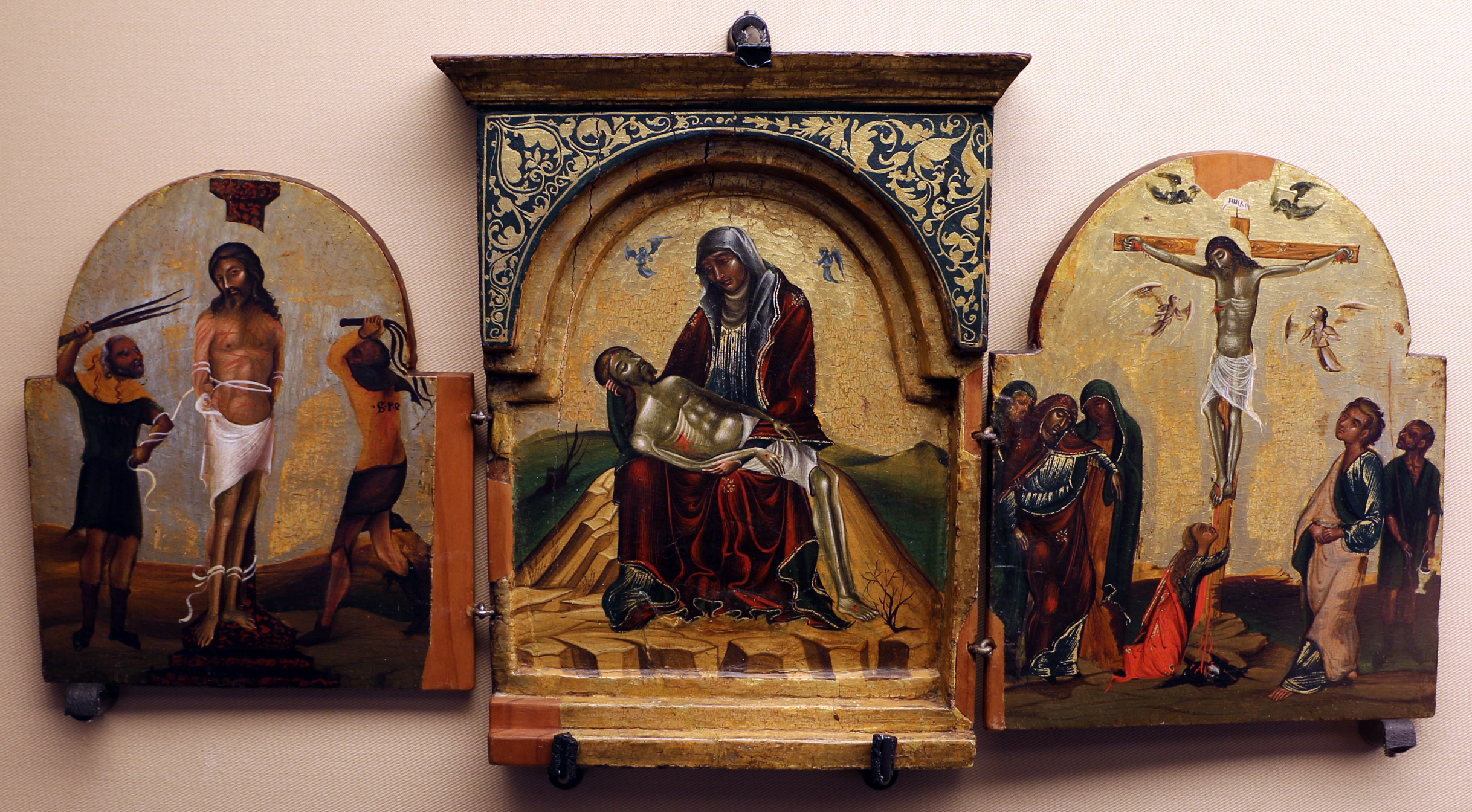
Triptych by Andreas Ritzos, c. 1510

The Institute of Neohellenic Research published three encyclopaedias outlining the records of countless artists from the fall of the Byzantine Empire until the establishment of modern Greece. It is the first time in history Greek painters were listed on this scale and magnitude. The work resembles Giorgio Vasari's Lives of the Most Excellent Painters, Sculptors, and Architects and Bernardo de' Dominici's Vite dei Pittori, Scultori, ed Architetti Napolitani.

The books feature thousands of paintings, frescos, and other artistic works. The encyclopaedias feature hundreds of painters. The three volumes are currently only available in Greek and entitled Έλληνες Ζωγράφοι μετά την Άλωση (1450–1830) or Greek Painters After the Fall (1450–1830). Eugenia Drakopoulou and Manolis Hatzidakis were the major contributors. The volumes were published in 1987, 1997, and 2010. The books feature many artists from the Cretan school or Greek Renaissance period. Drakopoulou continues her research with the institute until today.

The program's purpose is to build an archive of Greek painters after the fall of Constantinople (1450-1830). It features biographical details and an index of artistic works. The Institute of Neohellenic Research catalogues portable icons, church frescoes, and or any other artistic works. This is the first time in history a systematic record was accumulated in Greece representing the period.

== Greek painters (1454–1820) ==
Table of the total number of Greek painters, distributed by period and district from 1454 to 1820
Periods	Cretan School (Crete)	Heptanese School (Ionian Islands)	Epirus	Central Greece	Aegean Islands	Peloponnese	Misc.	Total
1454–1526	145	2	4	-	-	8	21	180
1527–1630	156	15	2	12	5	7	83	280
1631–1700	68	22	17	10	17	10	161	305
1701–1820	52	76	85	49	75	53	350	740
Totals	421	115	108	71	97	78	615	1,505

== Gallery ==
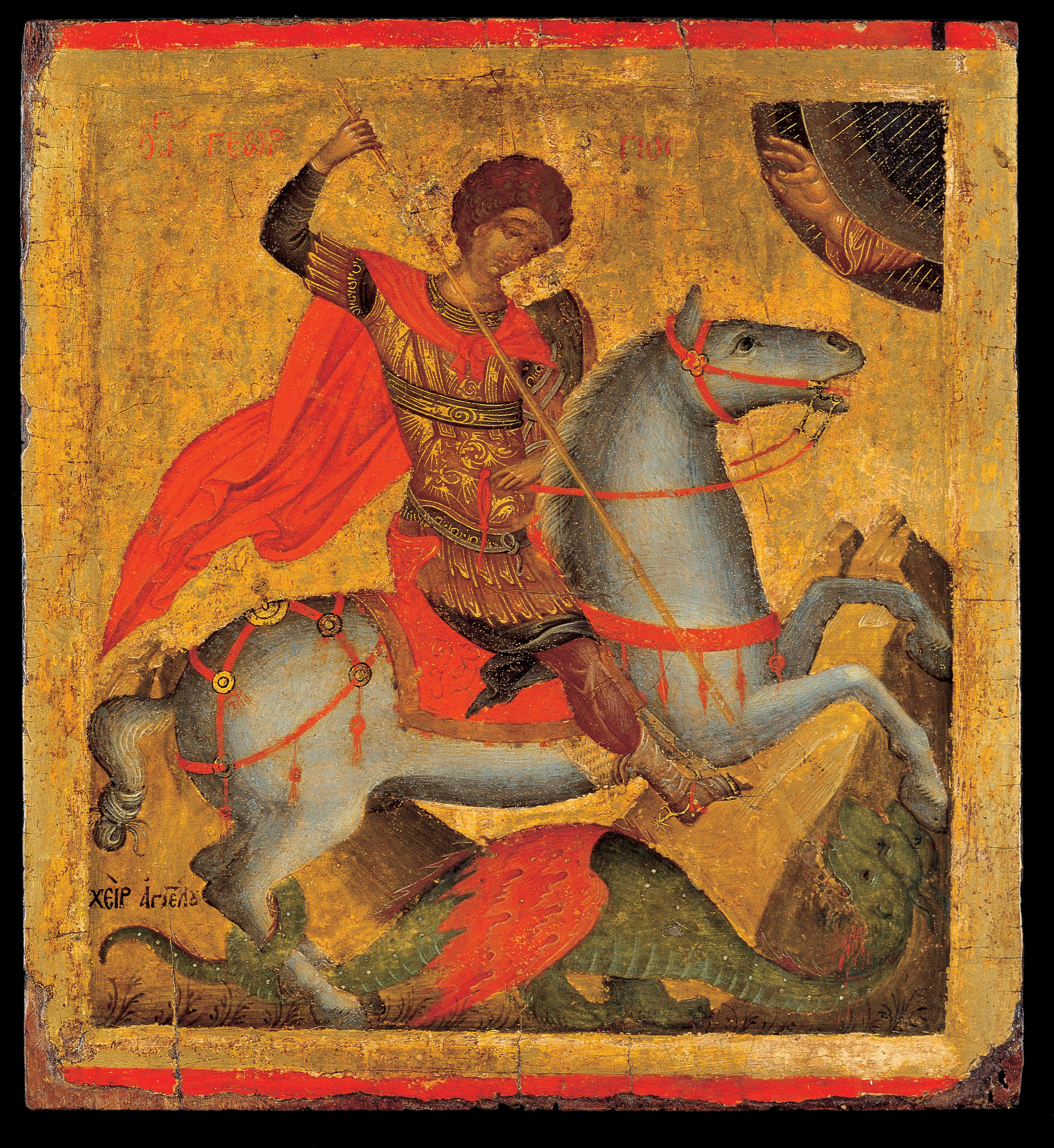
Saint George by Angelos Akotantos (15th century)

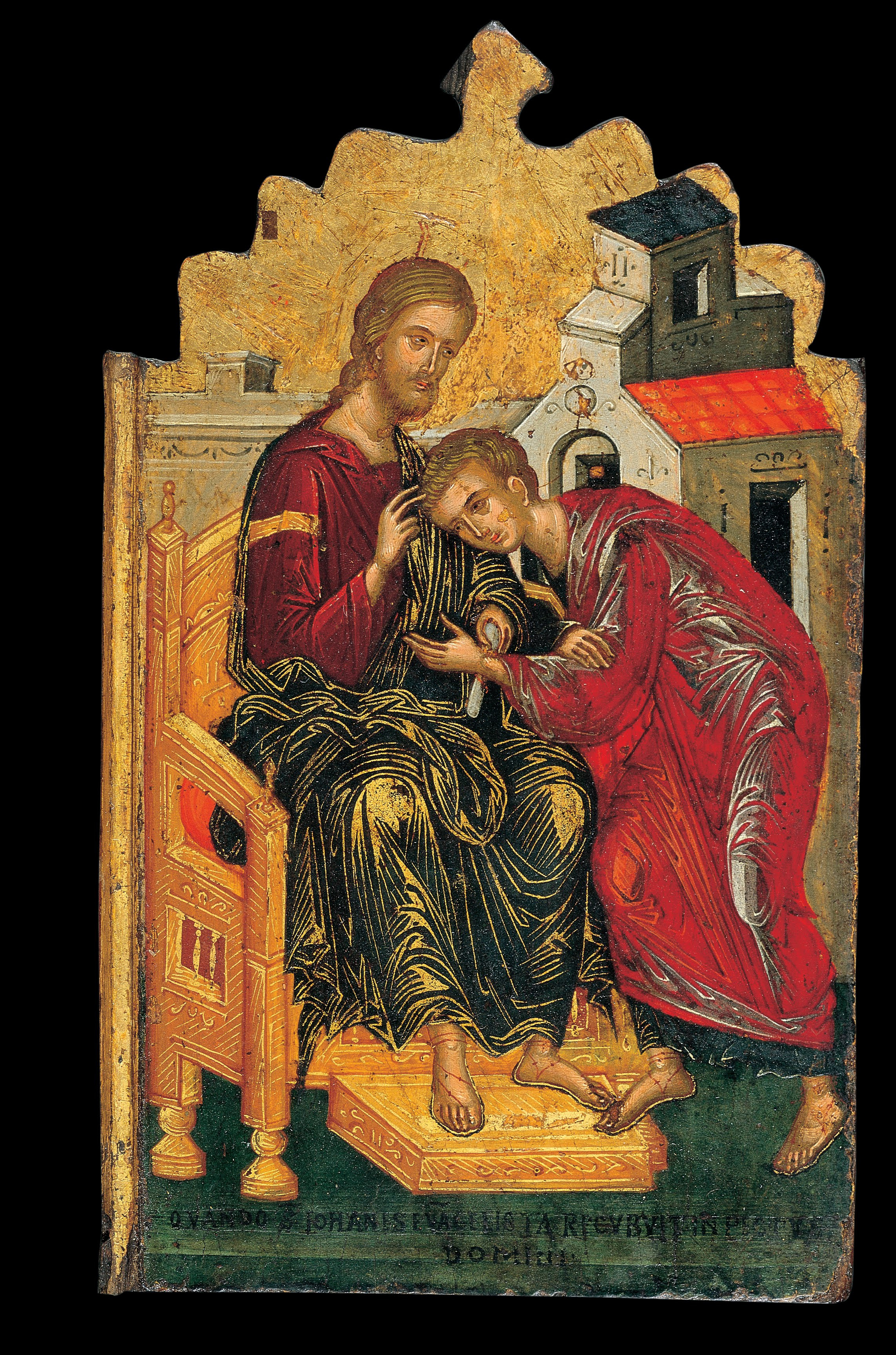
Two Scenes from the Life of Saint John the Divine by Andreas Ritzos (15th century) Benaki Museum

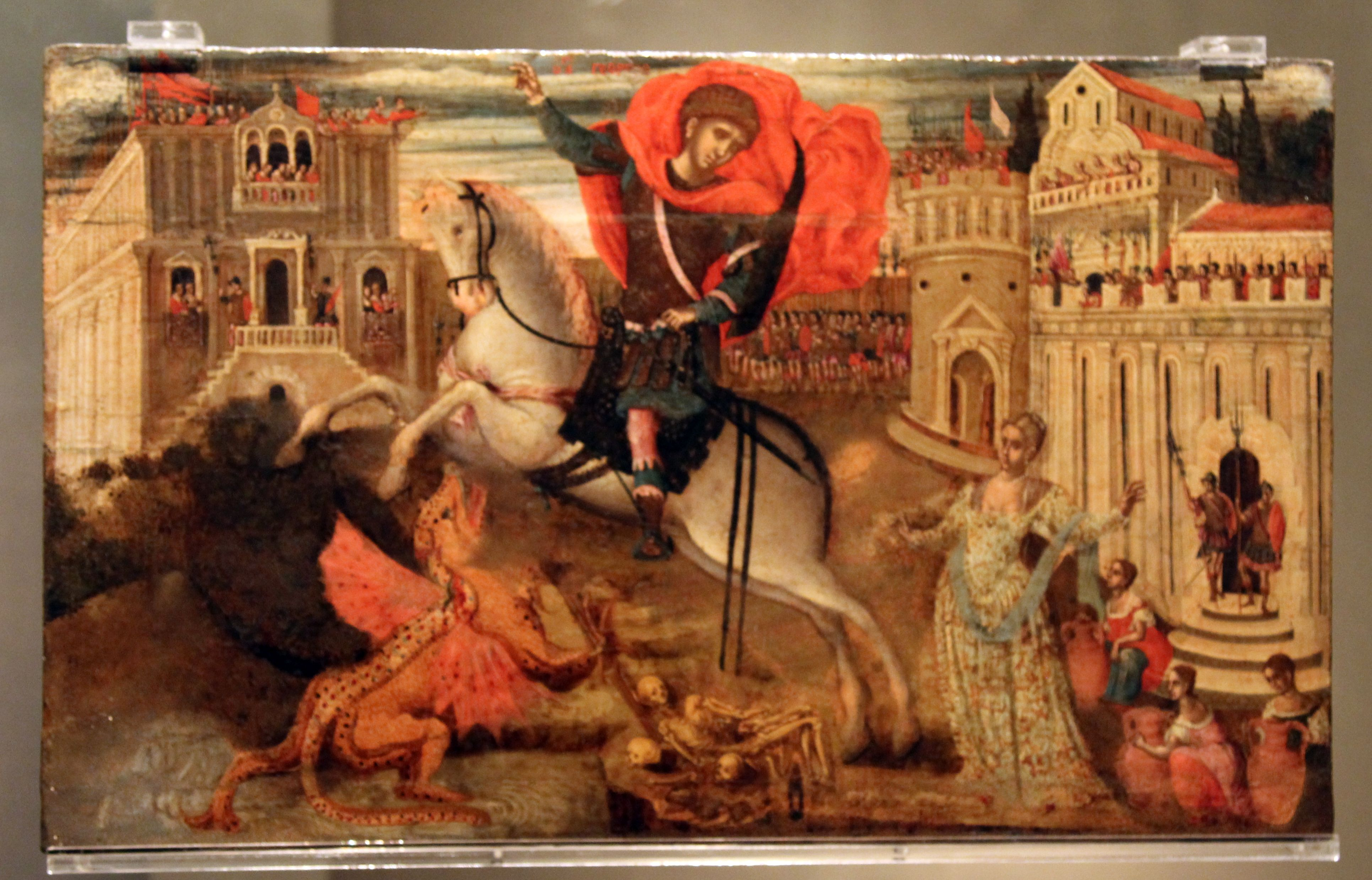
Saint George Dragon Slayer by Georgios Klontzas (16th)

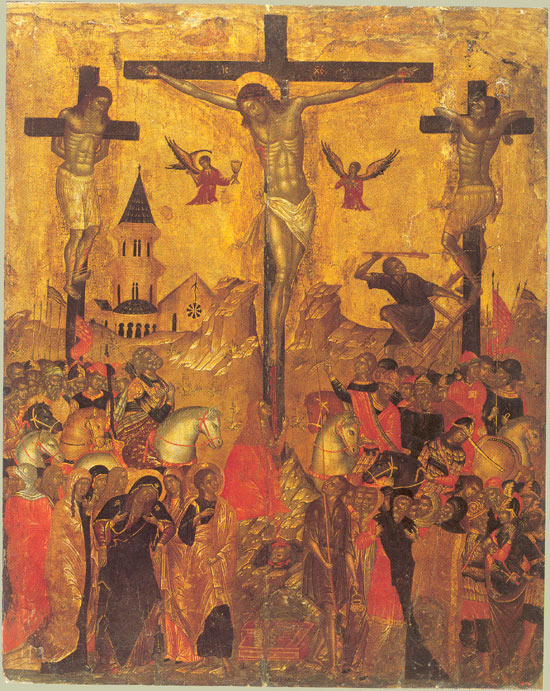
Crucifixion by Emmanuel Lambardos (17th)

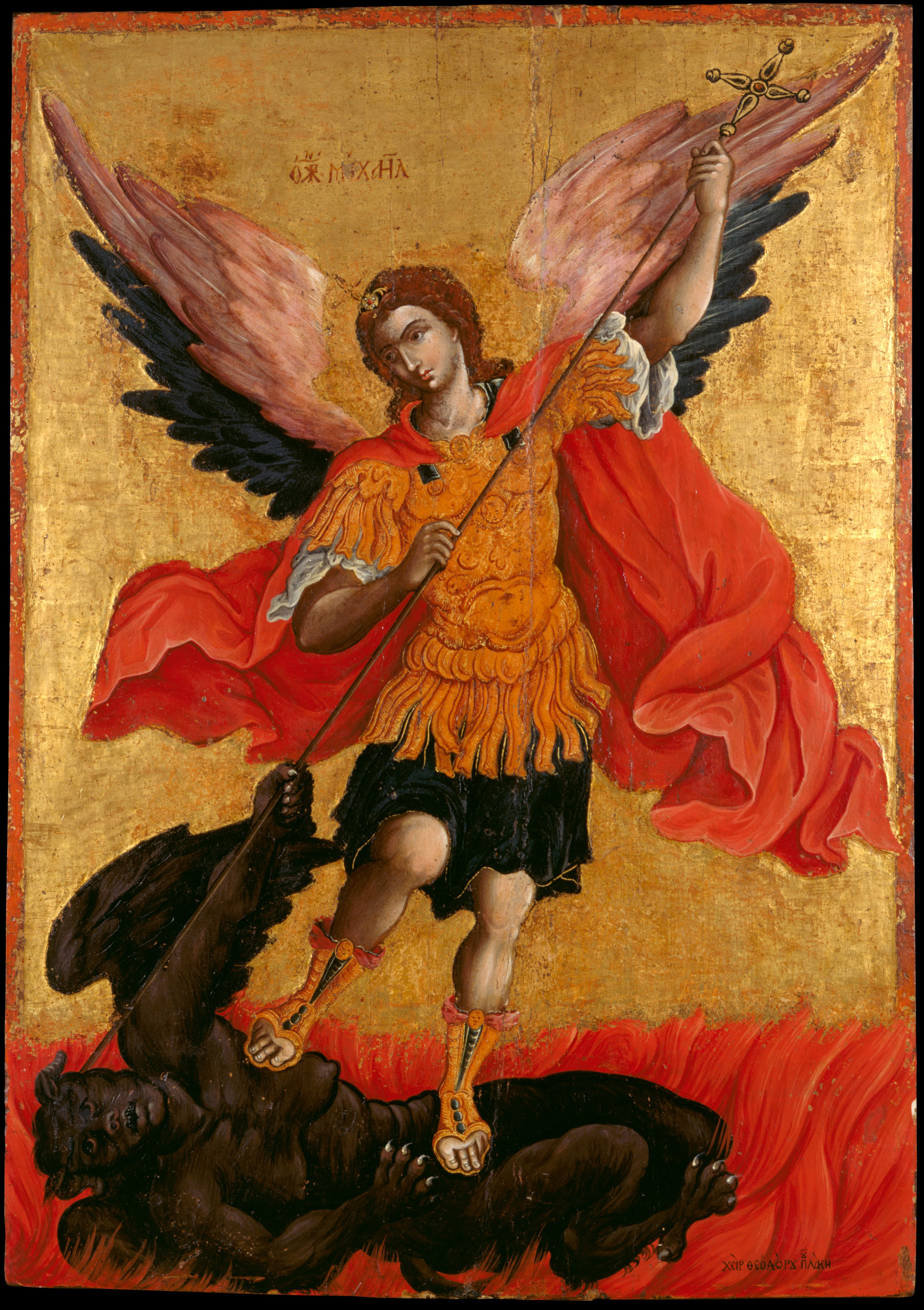
Archangel Michael by Theodoros Poulakis (17th)

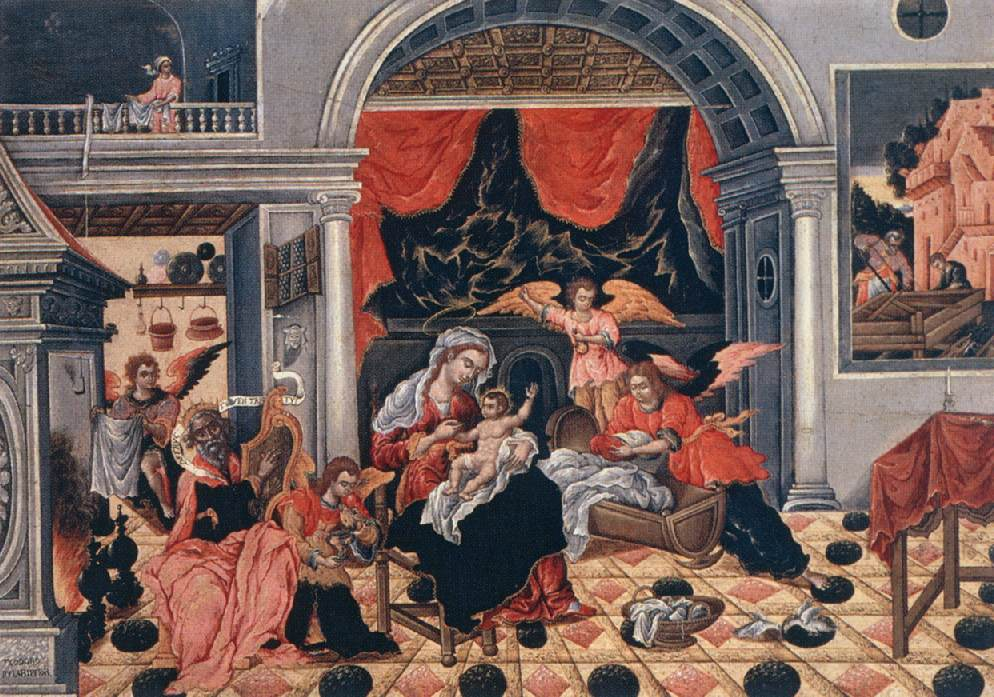
Nativity of Christ by Theodoros Poulakis

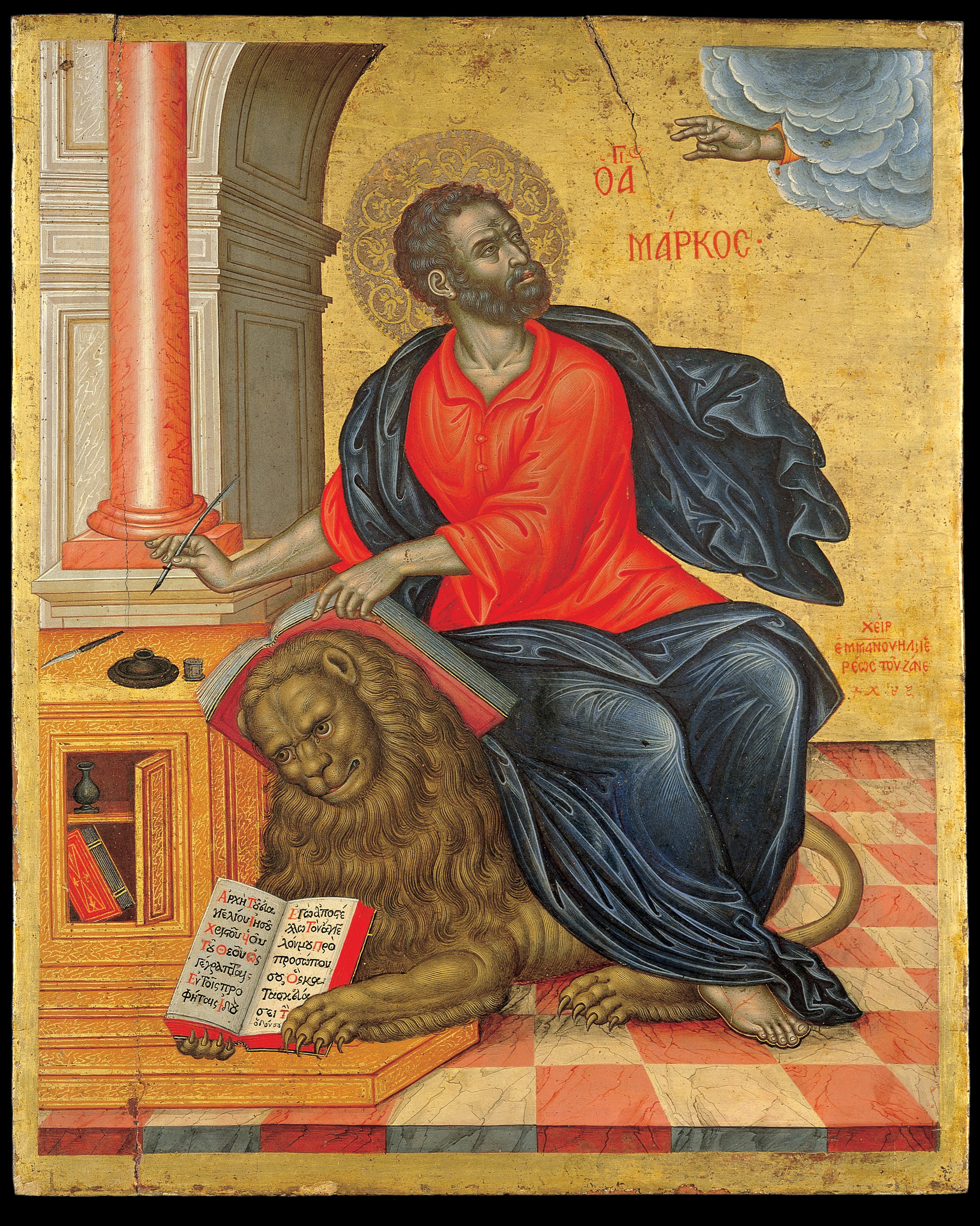
Saint Mark by Emmanuel Tzanes (17th)

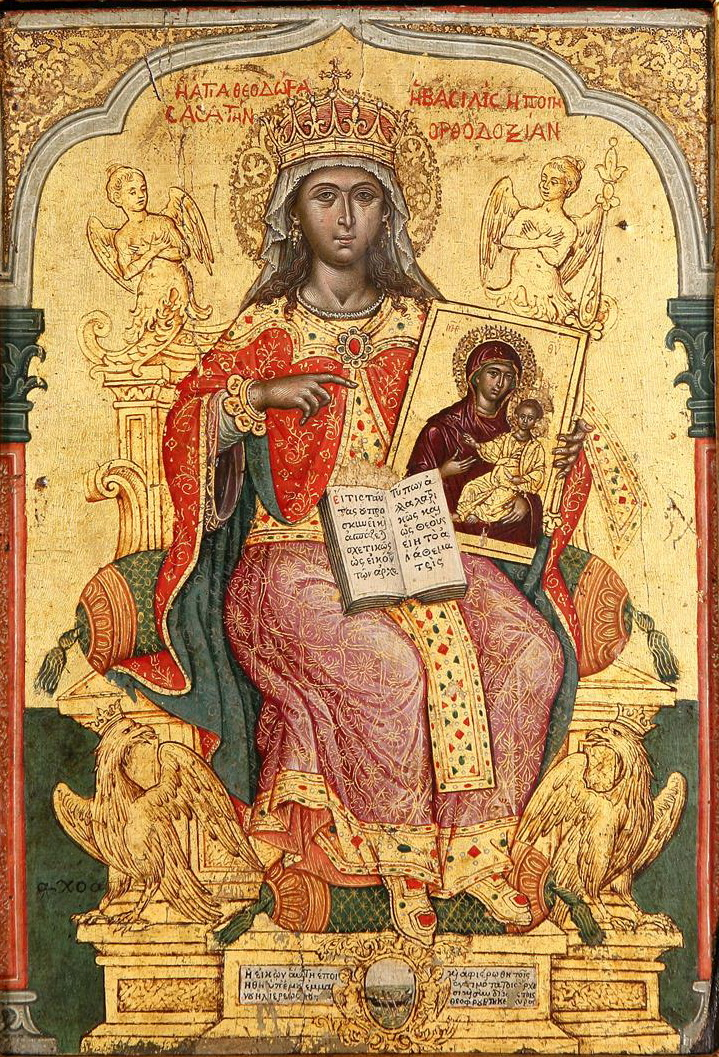
Saint Theodora by Emmanuel Tzanes

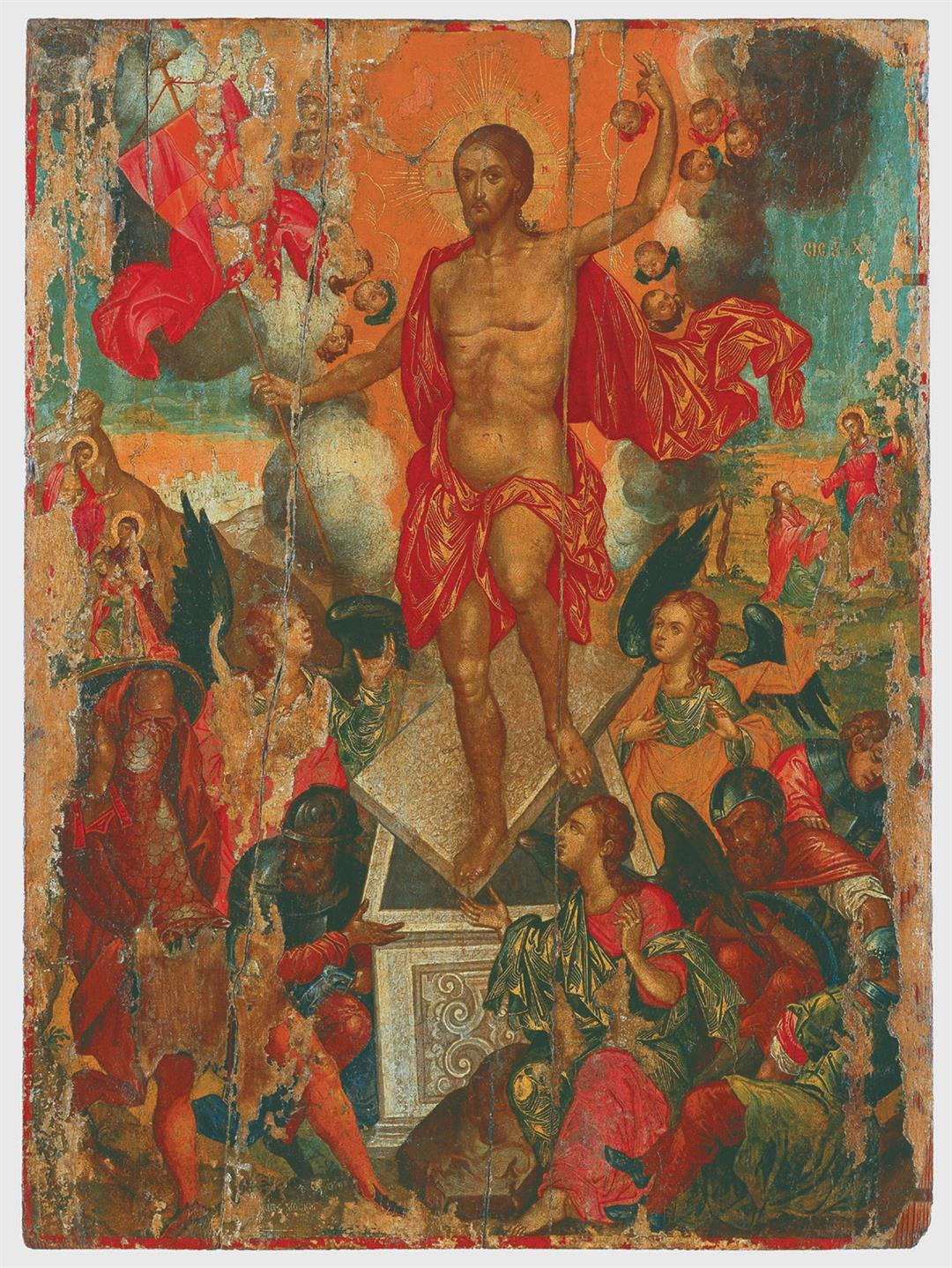
Resurrection by Elias Moskos (17th)

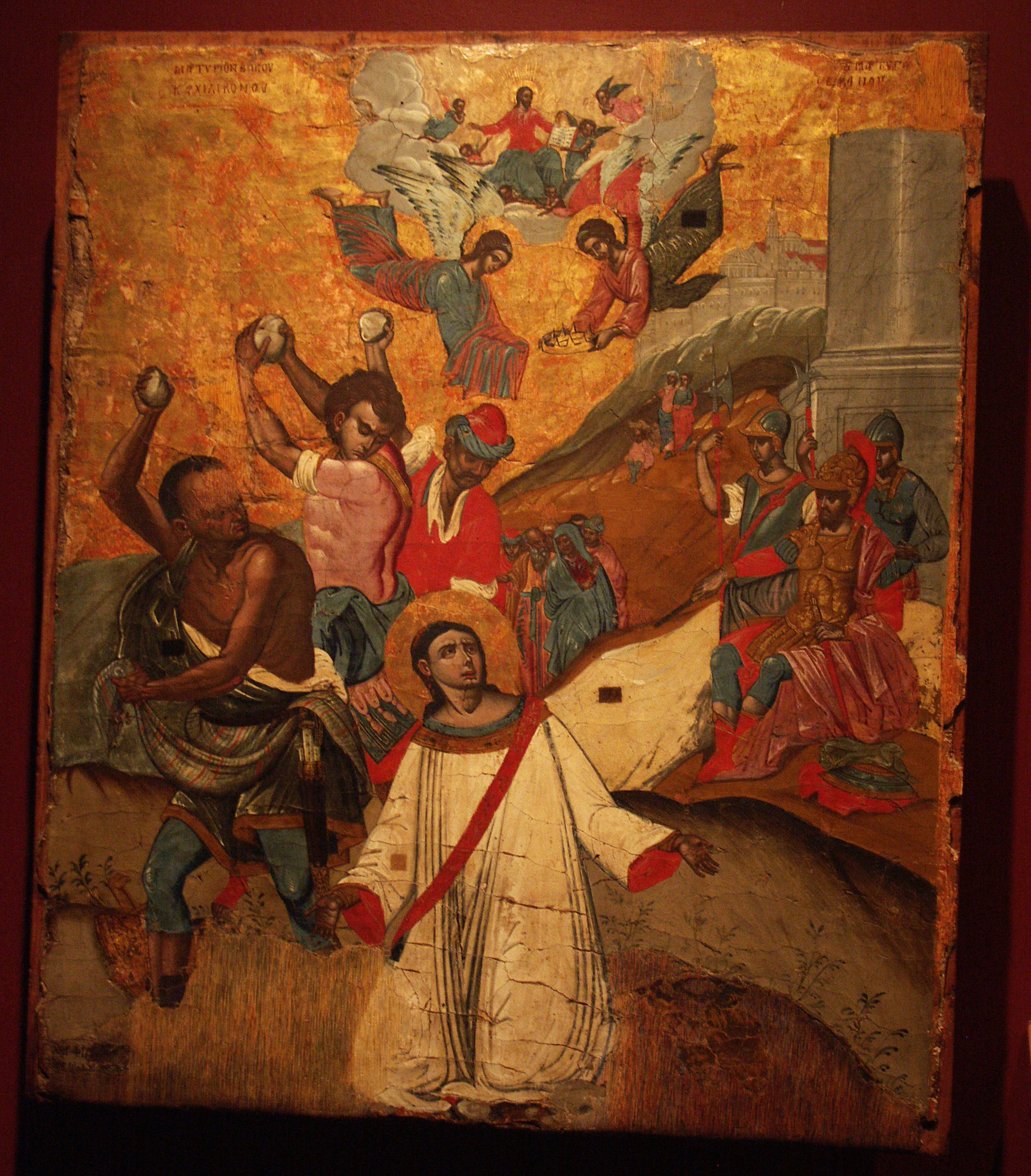
Martyrdom of Saint Stephen by Filotheos Skoufos (17th)

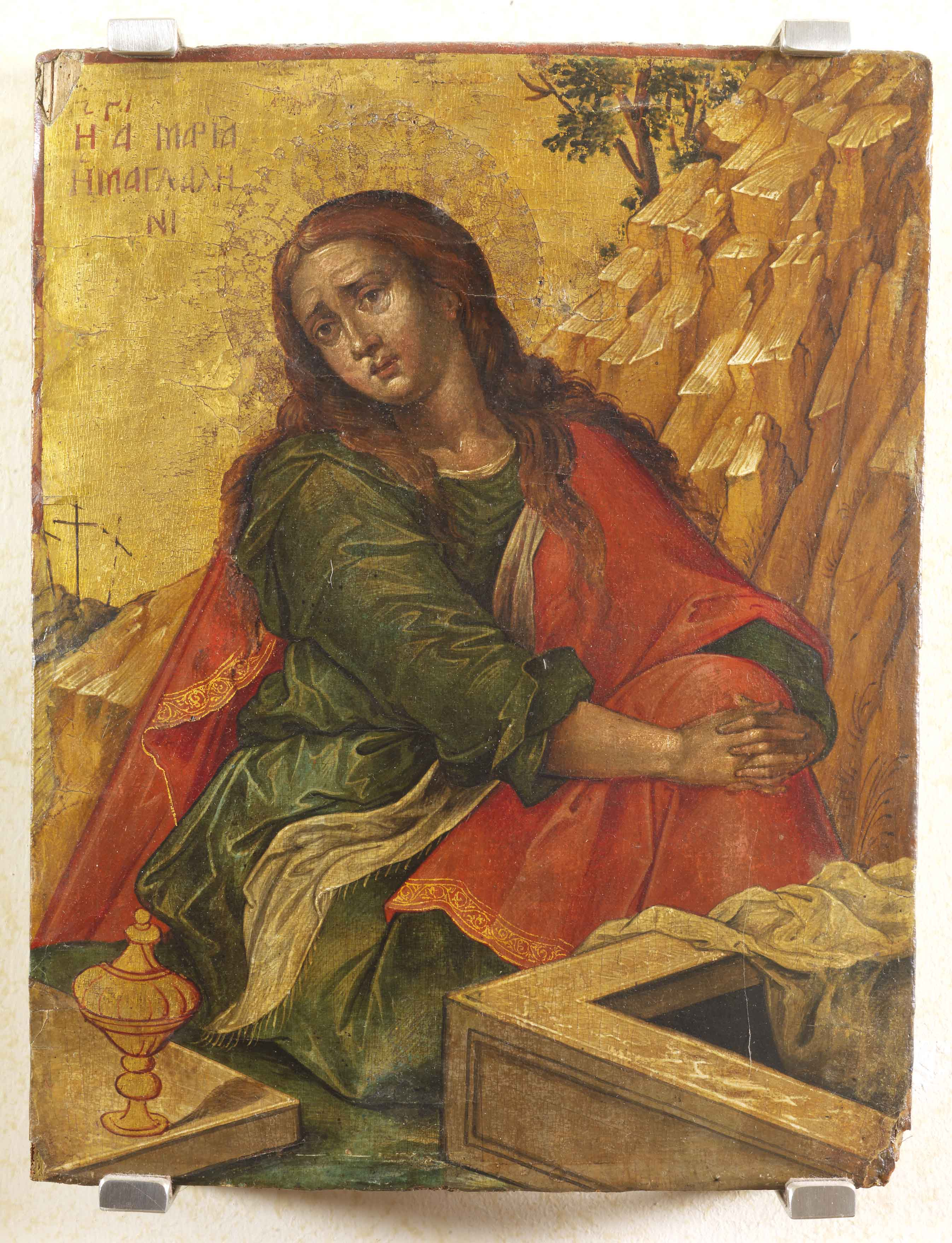
Mary Magdalene by Konstantinos Tzanes (17th)

== See also ==
- Greek scholars in the Renaissance
- Benaki Museum
- National Gallery (Athens)
- Vitsentzos Kornaros
