= Richard Mann =

Richard Mann may refer to:

- Richard Mann (American football) (born 1947), American football coach
- Richard Mann (cricketer) (born 1982), English cricketer
- Richard G. Mann (born 1949), professor of art at San Francisco State University
- Richie Mann (born 1954), Canadian politician
- Dick Mann (1934–2021), American motorcycle racer
- Richard Mann (biologist), see Larry Sandler Memorial Award
- Richard Mann (diplomat), see List of ambassadors of New Zealand
- Richard Mann (actor) in Cyberman
- Rick Mann (musician) in A Passing Fancy
- Rick Mann (voice actor) in Weiß Kreuz
