= Madonna of Constantinople =

Painting by Angelos Pitzamanos

- Παναγία Κωνσταντινούπολις (Greek), Madonna Di Constantinople (Italian)
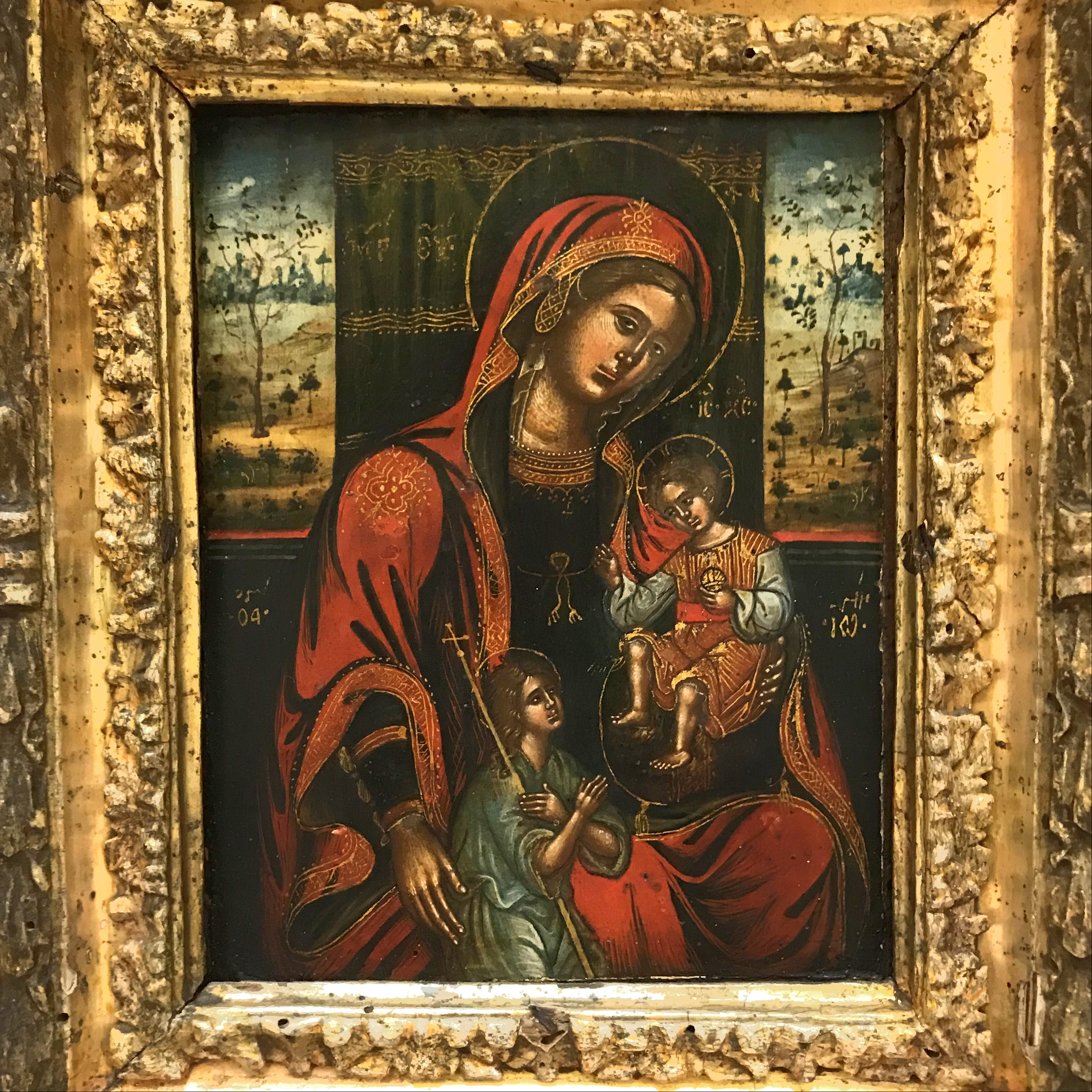
- Artist: Angelos Pitzamanos
- Year: c. 1530
- Medium: mixed media on wood
- Movement: Cretan School
- Subject: Virgin and Child with John the Baptist
- Dimensions: 16.7 cm × 13.2 cm (6.6 in × 5.2 in)
- Location: Pinacoteca Metropolitana di Bari, Bari, Italy
- Owner: Pinacoteca Metropolitana di Bari
- Website: Official Website

Madonna of Constantinople is a tempera painting created by Greek painter Angelos Pitzamanos. Angelo was from the island of Crete. He was active from 1482 to 1535. His teacher was famous painter Andreas Pavias. Angelo finished commissions with his brother Donatus Pitzamanos. Eleven remaining works are attributed to Angelo. He signed most of his works in Latin, his signature poem was Angelus Bizamanus the Greek painter from Crete.

The painting was nicknamed Madonna of Constantinople. His brother famous Greek painter Donatus Pitzamanos also created works called Madonna of Constantinople. Another work by Angelo was nicknamed the Madonna of Constantinople. It is located at the church of San Matteo Bisceglie, Italy. Madonna of Constantinople was a very common name for art affiliated with Constantinople. Italian Renaissance patrons preferred the works of Greek Byzantine masters from Constantinople. Constantinople and Thessaloniki were the epicenters of Greek Byzantine painting and the Palaeologan Renaissance. Another famous Greek painter Michele Greco da Valona was also affiliated with Constantinople. Greek painter Belisario Corenzio was named after the famous Byzantine General Belisarius.

Italian art began to transition away from the Italian-Greek Byzantine style both Angelo and Michele Greco De Valano adopted the new technique incorporating both Byzantine painting and the Italian Renaissance style. Both artists can be likened to another famous painter of Greek origin from the same period named Ioannis Permeniates. Greek painters such as El Greco and Michael Damaskinos followed the same path during the second half of the 16th century. Other Italian Renaissance painters of Greek origin such as Antonio Vassilacchi and Marco Basaiti completely adopted the Italian style. The Madonna of Constantinople by Angelo is located at the Pinacoteca metropolitana di Bari.

== Description ==
The painting was created in 1530. The materials used were mixed media on wood. The height of the small tablet is 6.6 in (16.7 cm) and the width is 5.2 in (13.2 cm). The Virgin is seated on a throne. The background features a decorated green curtain adorned with gilded decorations and faded Greek inscriptions. The artist creates the illusion of an outdoor aesthetically pleasing landscape to the left and right of the curtain. The landscape adds spatial depth to the painting. The painting features enhanced three-dimensionality of the drapery folds completely escaping the traditional Byzantine style but the rob exhibits traces of the ancient technique. The poses of the figures are more refined. The postures and gestures of the celestial beings are reminiscent of the Italian Renaissance style.

The artist constructed a figure that has substance, dimensionality, and spatial depth. The Virgin wears a bright red cloak. The hems are decorated with gold lines. The garment illustrates the artist's knowledge of advanced shadowing techniques prevalent at that time. The Virgin is wearing a bluish tunic under her heavenly robe. Her neck is decorated with red and gold friezes. The brown hair of the three figures is also painted in detail. All three celestial figures feature gold halos. The young figure of Jesus holds a sphere in his left hand. This was a common technique in Cretan paintings. Nikolaos Tzafouris introduced the style in his Madre della Consolazione. The Christ child is seated on a cushion with golden tassels. The young Saint John (San Giovannino) looks up at the Christ child. Saint John holds the patriarchal cross and kneels before the Christ child. He is wearing his traditional humble attire. On the back of the painting, the painter signed his name in white capital letters. The tablet also features a unique sun with alternating straight and serpentine rays. In the center, another inscription exists YHS (Yesus Hominum Salvator). The back also features two stars painted in gold.

== Gallery ==
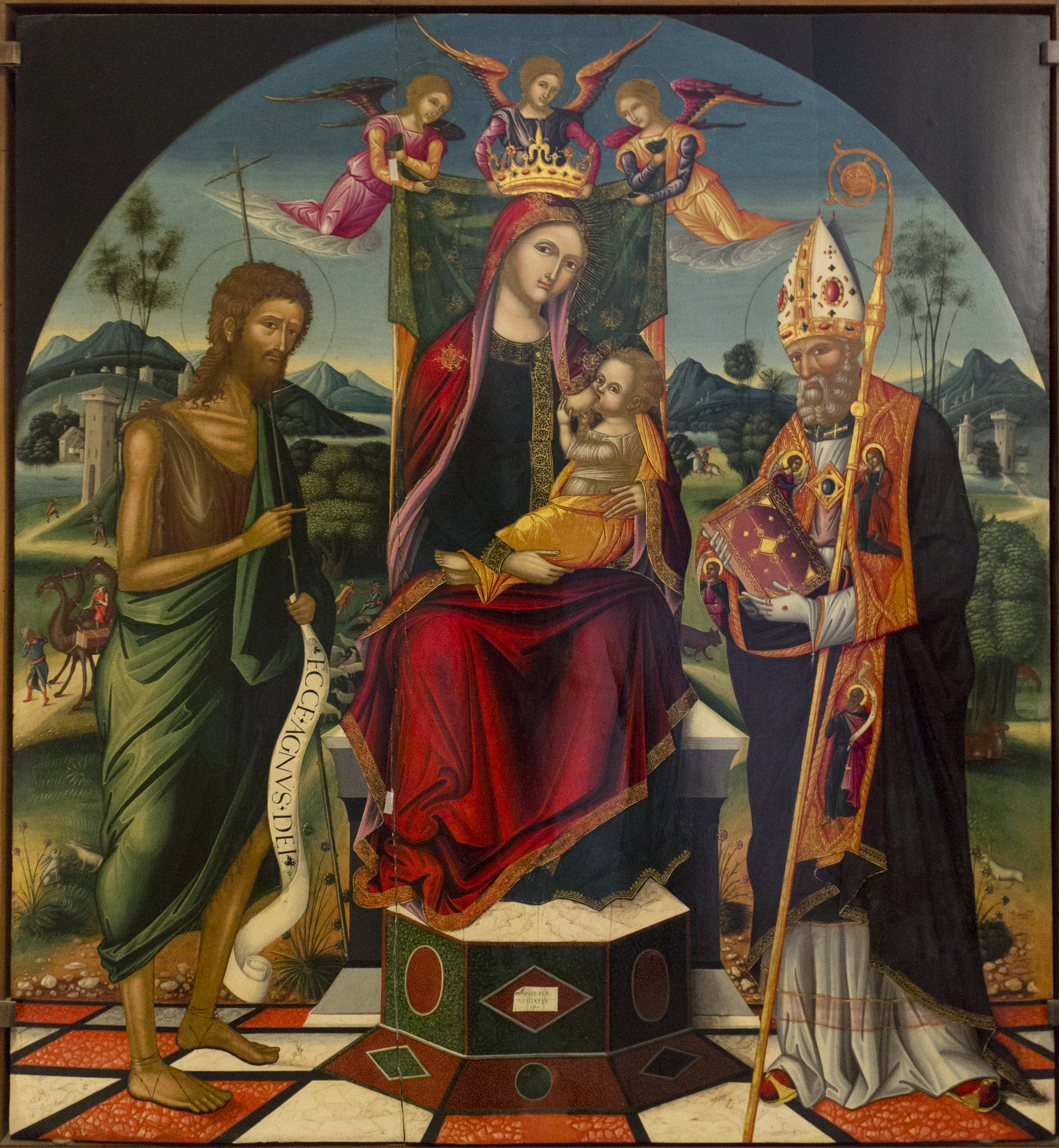
Nursing Madonna Permeniates

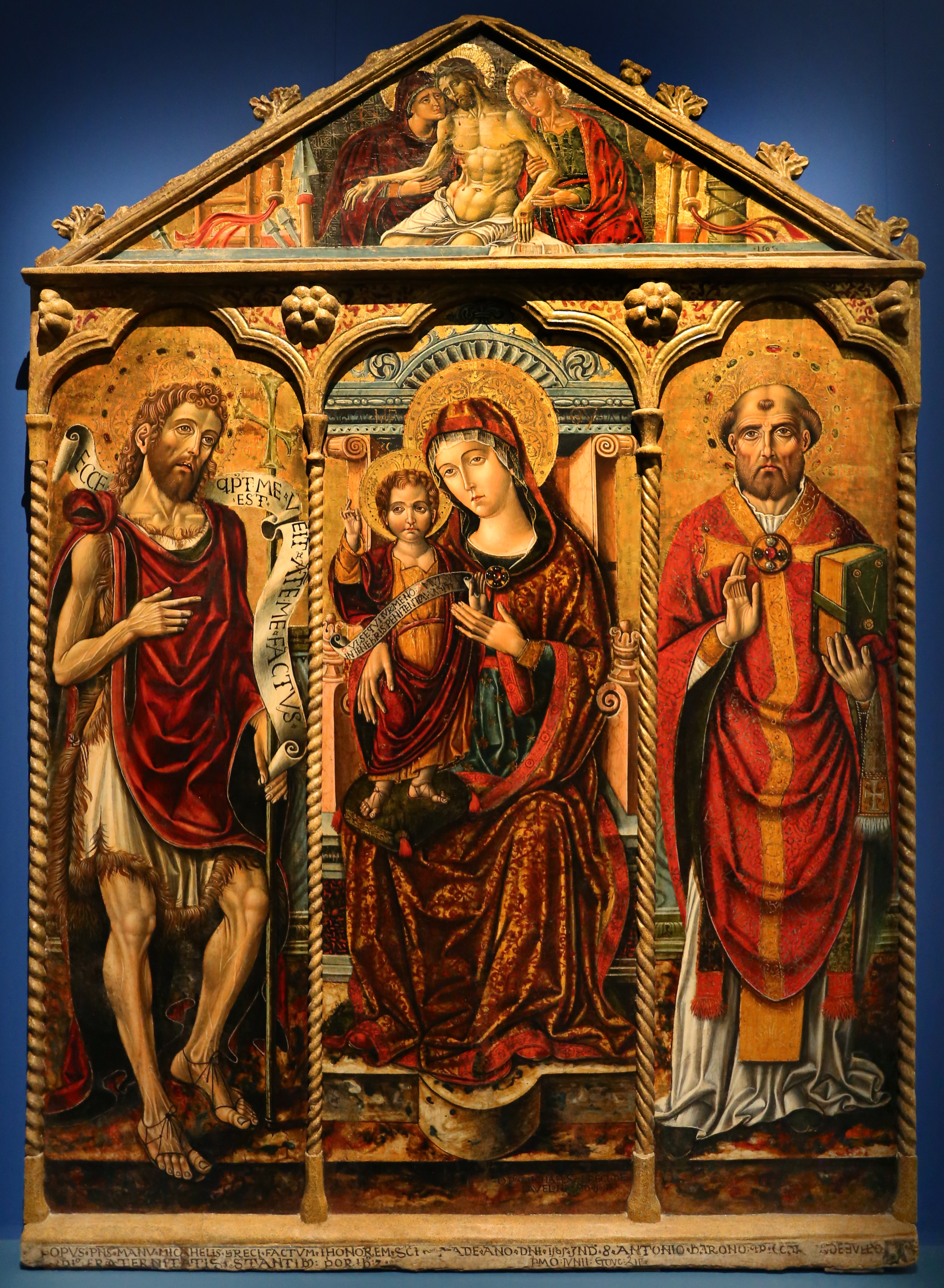
Madonna Triptych Michele
