= Cambridge Studies in the History of Art =

Cambridge Studies in the History of Art is a book series of the history of art published by Cambridge University Press. The editors were Francis Haskell, a fellow of King's College, Cambridge, and Nicholas Penny of the National Gallery. The first volume in the series was El Greco and his patrons: Three major projects by Richard G. Mann, published in 1986, in which Mann investigated three of El Greco's six major projects and the patrons responsible for them.

== Volumes ==
=== 1980s ===
- El Greco and his patrons: Three major projects, Richard G. Mann, 1986. ISBN 0521303923
- A bibliography of salon criticism in Second Empire Paris, Christopher Parsons & Martha Ward (compilers), 1986. ISBN 978-0521321495
- Giotto and the language of gesture, Moshe Barasch, 1987. ISBN 978-0521324540
- Power and display in the seventeenth century: The arts and their patrons in Modena and Ferrara, Janet Southorn, 1988. ISBN 9780521345637

=== 1990s ===
- Pavel Kuznetsov: His life and art, Peter Stupples, 1990. ISBN 978-0521364881
- A bibliography of salon criticism in Paris from the Ancien Regime to the restoration 1699-1827, Neil MacWilliam, 1991. ISBN 9780521346344
- A bibliography of salon criticism in Paris from the July Monarchy to the Second Republic, 1831-1851, Neil MacWilliam, 1991. ISBN 9780521400916
- Marcantonio Franceschini and the Liechtensteins: Prince Johann Adam Andreas and the decoration of the Liechtenstein Garden Palace at Rossau-Vienna, Dwight C. Miller, 1991. ISBN 9780521365031
- The Oriental obsession: Islamic inspiration in British and American art and architecture 1500-1920, John Sweetman, 1991. ISBN 9780521407250
- Pittoresco: Marco Boschini, his critics, and their critiques of painterly brushwork in seventheenth-and eighteenth-century Italy, Philip Lindsay Sohm, 1991. ISBN 9780521382564
- Japonisme in western painting from Whistler to Matisse, Klaus Berger, translated by David Britt, 1992.
- Palma Vecchio, Philip Rylands, 1992. ISBN 978-0521373326
- The letters of Lucien to Camille Pissarro, 1883-1903, Anne Thorold (editor), 1993. ISBN 9780521390347
- Sir Richard Westmacott, sculptor, Marie Busco, 1994. ISBN 9780521390651
- The art of Giovanni Antonio da Pordenone: Between dialect and language, Charles E. Cohen, 1996. ISBN 9780521306300
