= Donato Bizamano =

Greek Renaissance painter

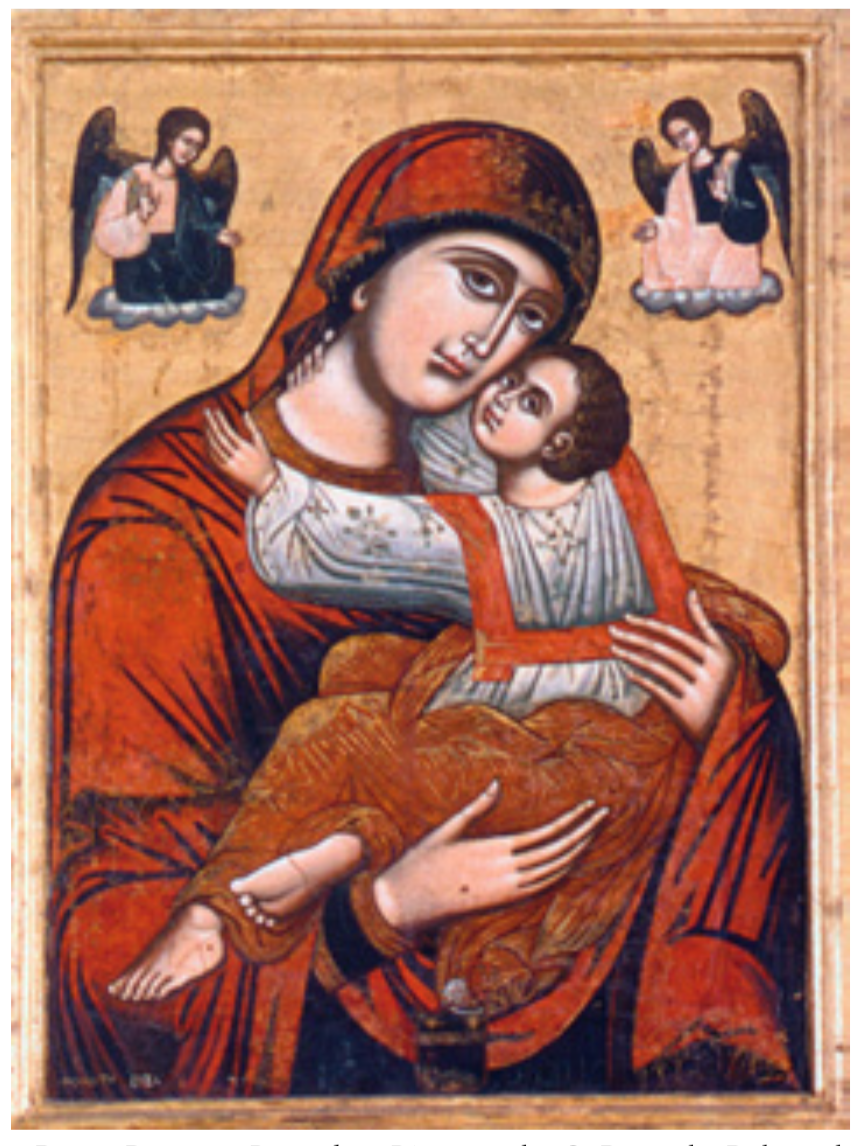
- Virgin and Child
- Born: before 1500
- Died: 1550
- Movement: Cretan school School of Otranto
- Years active: 1539-1542
- Style: Maniera Greca; Italian Renaissance
- Relatives: Angelos Bizamano

Donato Bizamano (Greek: Δονάτος Πιτζαμάνος; before 1500–1550) was a Cretan Renaissance painter. He was active in Italy in the 16th century along with a relative, Angelo Bizamano, possibly his older brother. His works can be found in the Puglia region, where they had an active workshop. The Bizamano's belonged to the School of Otranto and the Cretan School. The painters mixed the maniera greca or Cretan style and the Italian style prevalent in the region, thus forming the School of Otranto. Giovanni Maria Scupula was another painter who painted in the same style and belonged to the School of Otranto. Giovanni and his brother Fabrizio were active in Otranto in the early part of the 16th century. They had a successful workshop painting in the Cretan Style, following the approach of the Cretan School. Angelo, Donato, Giovanni, and Fabrizio all painted in the Cretan Style, but there is evidence that Donato and Angelo were of Greek origin and from the island of Crete. Donato has over nine works attributed to him, which are mostly in Italy.

== Biography ==
Donato Bizamano was born on the island of Crete. His brother or relative Angelo Bizamano, studied under Andreas Pavias for five years. Angelo typically signed his works Angelus Bizamanus Grecus Cadiotus Pinxit in Otranto (Angelus Bizamanus, the Greek from the Kingdom of Candia, Painted in Otranto). Donato makes his first appearance in 1518 because his works can be found in the region where Angelo was commissioned by the Brotherhood of Santo Spirito in Komolac, Dalmatia, to execute an altarpiece for the Church of San Fermo. Donato's painting of the Virgin and Child is in Dubrovnik, Croatia. Donato makes his first documented appearance in 1532, working alongside Angelos in Otranto and Barletta. In 1539, Donato completed his signed and dated work entitled Madonna and Child with Saints Francis and Catherine. The work is sometimes referred to as Madonna de Constantinopoli. Another work named the Nativity of Jesus completed in 1542, was also signed by the artist. Some of his remaining works can be found in the Vatican, Bari, and Lecce.

== Notable works ==
- San Valentino
- Jesus the Redeemer
- Madonna di Costantinopoli

== Gallery ==
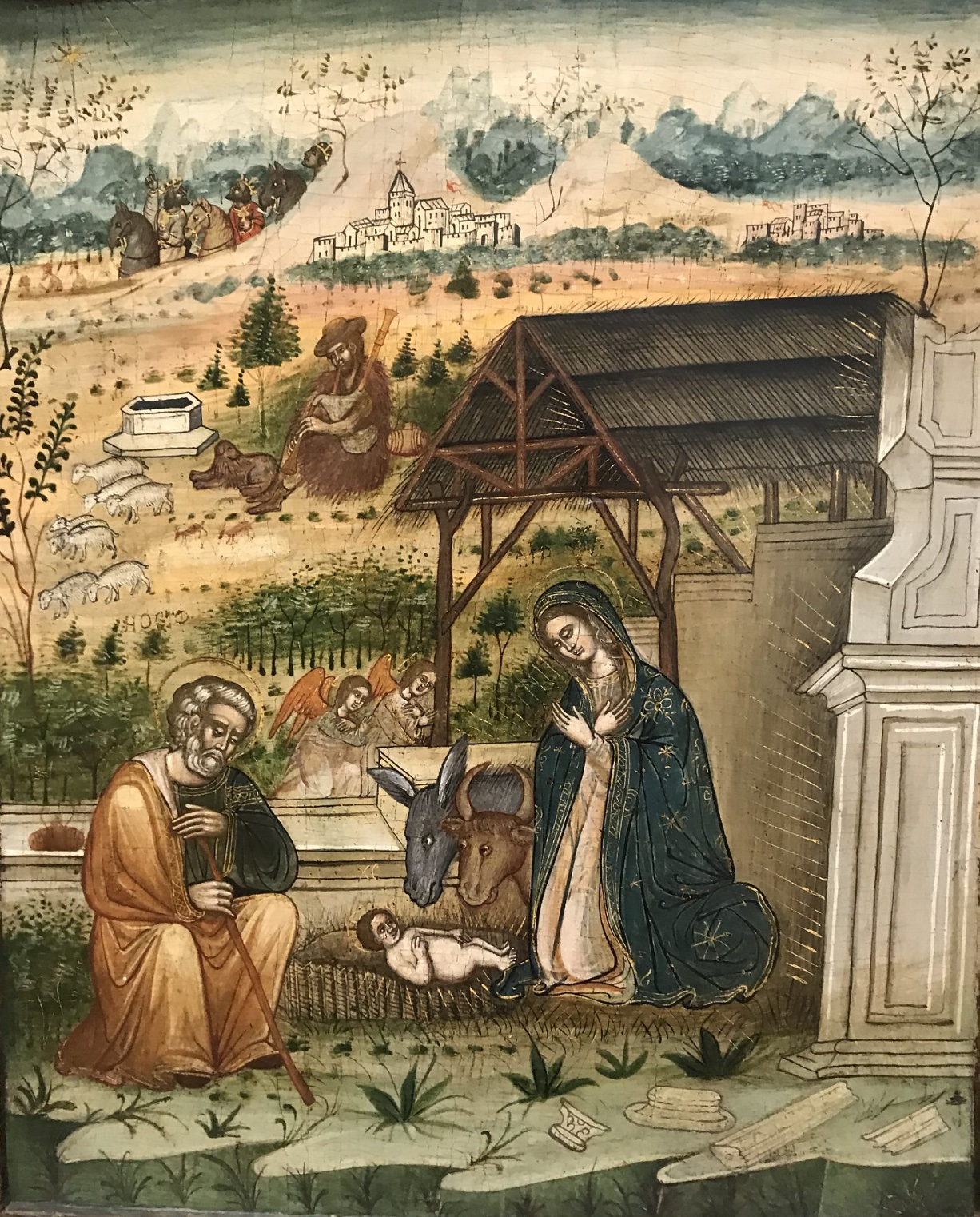
Nativity

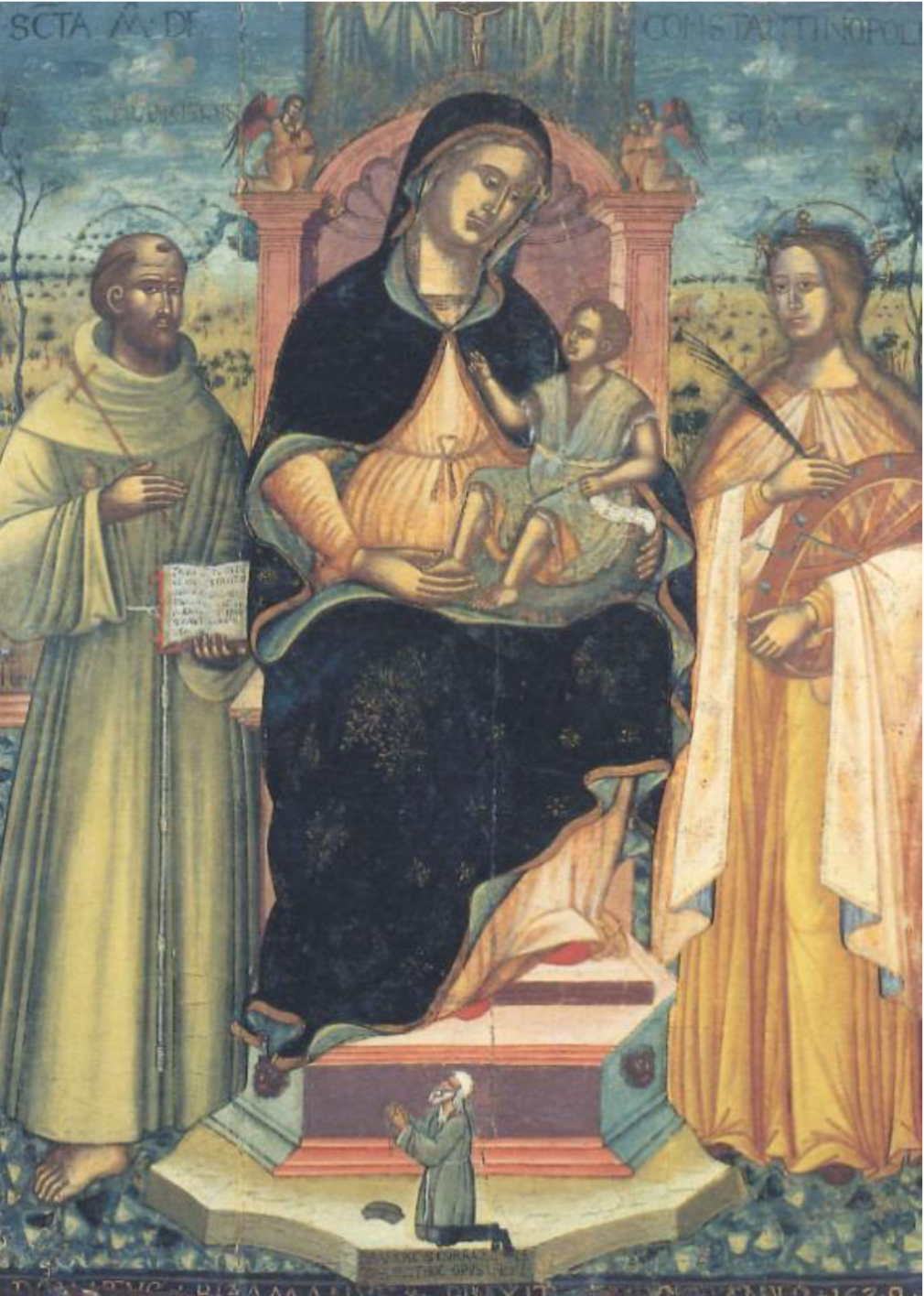
Madonna and Child with Saints Francis and Catherine

== Bibliography ==
- Hatzidakis, Manolis; Drakopoulou, Evgenia (1997). Έλληνες Ζωγράφοι μετά την Άλωση (1450–1830). Τόμος 2: Καβαλλάρος – Ψαθόπουλος [Greek Painters after the Fall of Constantinople (1450–1830). Volume 2: Kavallaros – Psathopoulos] (in Greek). Athens: Center for Modern Greek Studies, National Research Foundation. hdl:10442/14088. ISBN 960-7916-00-X.
- Mazzotta, Gabriele (1988). "Icone di Puglia e Basilicata dal Medioevo al Settecento" [Icons of Puglia and Basilicata from the Middle Ages to the Eighteenth Century] (PDF) (in Italian). Milan, Italy: Mazzotta Publishing. Archived (PDF) from the original on June 13, 2025.
- Voulgaropoulou, Margarita (July 1, 2021). "A 'Lost' Panel and a Missing Link: Angelos Bitzamanos and the Case of the Scottivoli Altarpiece for the Church of San Francesco Delle Scale in Ancona". Arts. 3 (10). ISSN 2076-0752.
- Matthiessen, Sophia; Morrison, Gordon, eds. (2022). Heavenly Beings Icons of the Christian Orthodox World (PDF). Auckland, New Zealand: Auckland Art Gallery Toi o Tāmaki.
