= National Gallery of Art Systematic Catalogue =

The Collections of the National Gallery of Art Systematic Catalogue is a project of the National Gallery of Art, Washington, to publish a comprehensive catalogue of the paintings, sculpture, and decorative arts in the gallery's collection.

The project was established in the early 1980s and the first volume was on early Netherlandish art published in 1986. When complete it will comprise approximately thirty volumes documenting more than 5000 works of art. Prints and drawings were excluded from the project as being too many in number. The second volume, prepared by Jonathan Brown and Richard G. Mann, covered Spanish paintings of the fifteenth to nineteenth centuries and was published in 1990.

== Volumes ==
- American Naive Paintings, Deborah Chotner, with contributions by Julie Aronson, Sarah D. Cash, and Laurie Weitzenkorn, 1992.
- American Paintings of the Eighteenth Century, Ellen G. Miles, with contributions by Patricia Burda, Cynthia J. Mills, and Leslie Kaye Reinhardt, 1995.
- American Paintings of the Nineteenth Century, Part I, Franklin Kelly, with Nicolai Cikovsky Jr., Deborah Chotner, and John Davis, 1996.
- American Paintings of the Nineteenth Century, Part II, Robert Wilson Torchia, with Deborah Chotner and Ellen G. Miles, 1998.
- British Paintings of the Sixteenth through Nineteenth Centuries, John Hayes, 1992.
- Decorative Arts, Part II: Far Eastern Ceramics and Paintings; Persian and Indian Rugs and Carpets, Virginia Bower, Josephine Hadley Knapp, Stephen Little, and Robert Wilson Torchia, with contributions by Judy Ozone and William Sargent, 1998.
- Dutch Paintings of the Seventeenth Century, Arthur K. Wheelock Jr., 1995.
- Early Netherlandish Painting, John Oliver Hand and Martha Wolff, 1986.
- European Sculpture of the Nineteenth Century, Ruth Butler and Suzanne Glover Lindsay, with Alison Luchs, Douglas Lewis, Cynthia J. Mills, and Jeffrey Weidman, 2001.
- French Paintings of the Nineteenth Century, Part I: Before Impressionism, Lorenz Eitner, 2000.
- French Paintings of the Fifteenth through the Eighteenth Century, Philip Conisbee with contributing editor Richard Rand, with Joseph Baillio, Gail Feigenbaum, Frances Gage, John Oliver Hand, Benedict Leca and Pauline Maguire Robison, 2009.
- German Paintings of the Fifteenth through Seventeenth Centuries, John Oliver Hand, with the assistance of Sally E. Mansfield, 1993.
- Italian Paintings of the Fifteenth Century, Miklós Boskovits and David Alan Brown, with contributions by Robert Echols, Gretchen A. Hirschauer, Eleonora Luciano, Rosamond E. Mack, Joseph Manca, and J. Russell Sale, 2004.
- Italian Paintings of the Seventeenth and Eighteenth Centuries, Diane De Grazia and Eric Garberson, with Edgar Peters Bowron, Peter M. Lukehart, and Mitchell Merling, 1996.
- Renaissance Medals: Volume One: Italy, John Graham Pollard with the assistance of Eleonora Luciano and Maria Pollard, 2007.
- Renaissance Medals: Volume Two: France, Germany, The Netherlands, and England, John Graham Pollard with the assistance of Eleonora Luciano and Maria Pollard, 2007.
- Spanish Paintings of the Fifteenth through Nineteenth Centuries, Jonathan Brown and Richard G. Mann, 1990. ISBN 978-0521401074
- Western Decorative Arts, Part I: Medieval, Renaissance, and Historicizing Styles including Metalwork, Enamels, and Ceramics, Rudolf Distelberger, Alison Luchs, Philippe Verdier, and Timothy H. Wilson, with contributions by Daphne S. Barbour, Shelley G. Sturman, and Pamela B. Vandiver, 1993.
