= Angelos Pitzamanos =

Greek Renaissance painter (1467–1535)

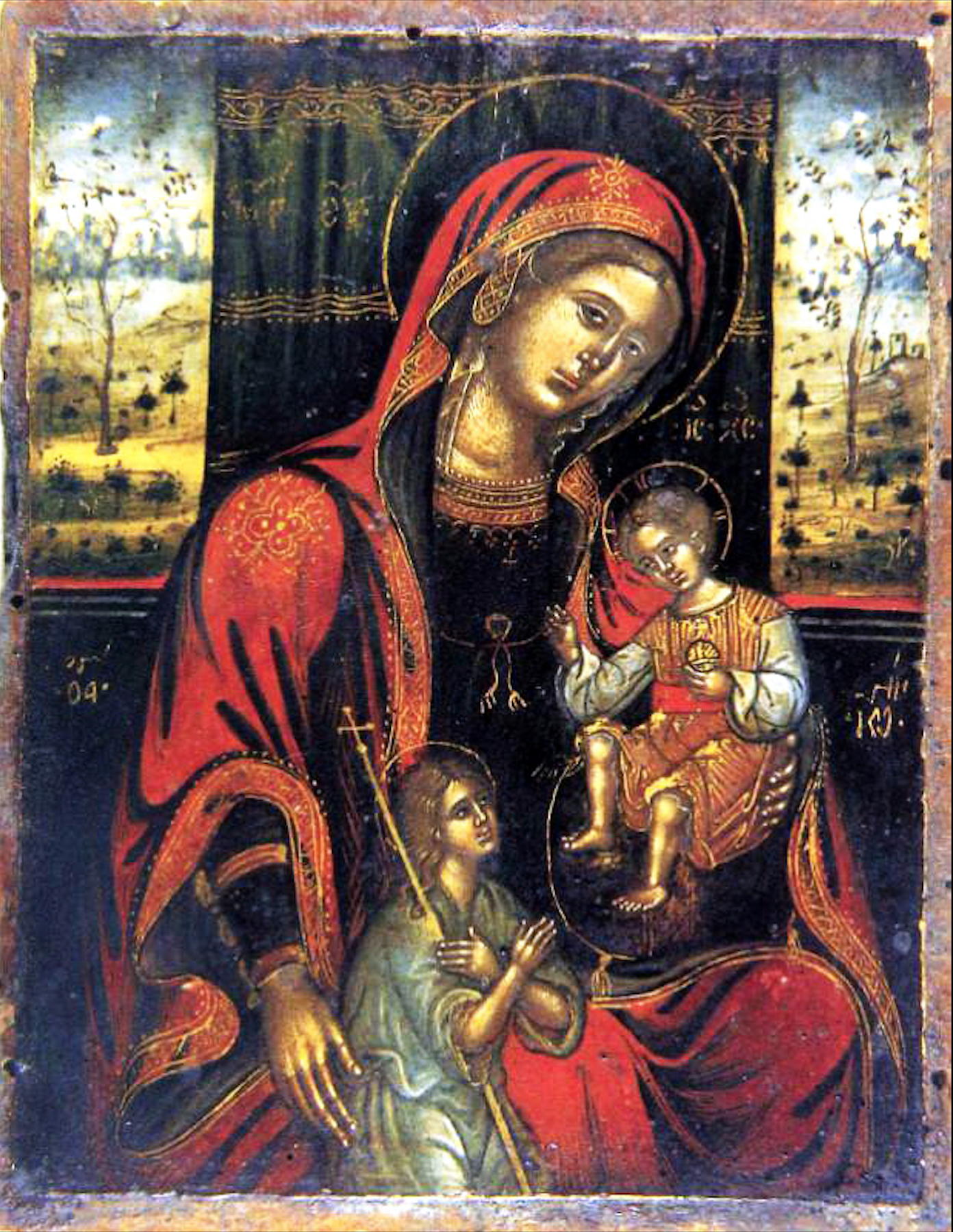
- Virgin and Child with Saint John
- Born: 1467
- Died: 1535 (aged 67–68)
- Notable work: Madonna of Constantinople
- Movement: Cretan school
- Years active: 1482–1535
- Style: Maniera Greca; Italian Renaissance
- Relatives: Donatus Pitzamanos

Angelos Pitzamanos (Greek: Άγγελος Πιτζαμάνος; 1467–1535) was a Greek Renaissance painter. The artist is sometimes referred to as Angelos Bitzamanos. He was born in Crete and migrated to Otranto, Southern Italy, where he did most of his work. A contract between Andreas Pavias and Pitzamanos illustrates that Pitzamanos was his apprentice. Angelos was a student of Andreas Pavias for five years (1482–1487). It is evident that his work featured both the Greek style and the Italian style of the time. Pitzamanos later became a famous master.

== History ==
Angelos was born on the island of Candia. His father's name was Nicholas. Both Angelos and his brother Donatos were active painters. Angelos studied under Andreas Pavias for five years. He traveled all over the Venetian Empire painting for various patrons. Some of the works were signed by him and his brother.

Bizamanos painted a very famous triptych, which was exhibited in Rome at the Accoramboni Palace. The triptych was acquired by Henry Walters with the Massarenti collection in 1902. The central panel features Christ and the Virgin. The left-wing shows Saint Jerome in the desert and the right features John the Baptist. The triptych was painted by Angelos Bitzamanos, an inscription on the inside left indicates Angelus/Bi/Zamanus/Pinxit. Another form of his inscription was Angelus Bizamanus Grecus Cadiotus Pinxit in Otranto. Some of these works are in the Walters Art Museum.

Angelos was active in Crete, Dalmatia, and Italy. In 1518, he was commissioned to create an altarpiece for the Confraternity of the Holy Spirit in Komolac, Dalmatia, a colony of Venice. His brother Donata Bizamanos joined him. They painted together in Otranto and Barletta. Some other pieces included the Predella of Komolac and Icon of Visitation by Angles.

== Gallery ==
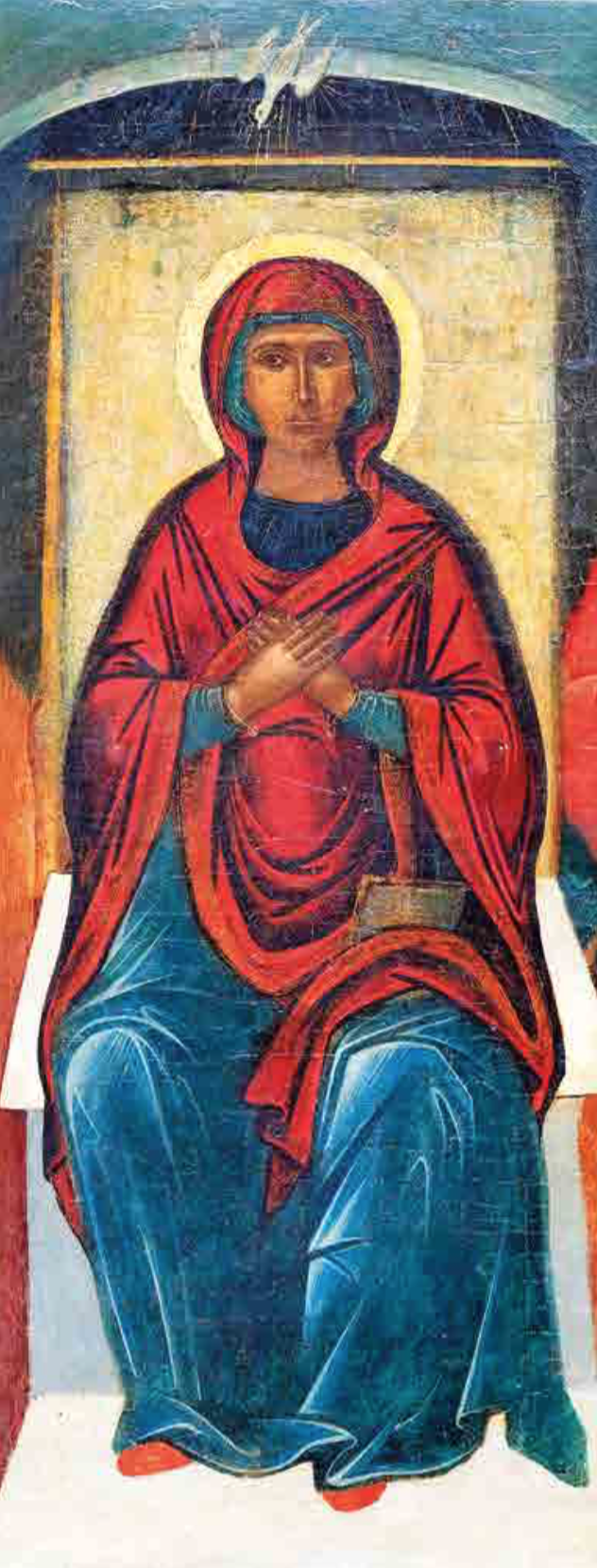
Madonna Enthroned Detail from Pentecost Polyptych

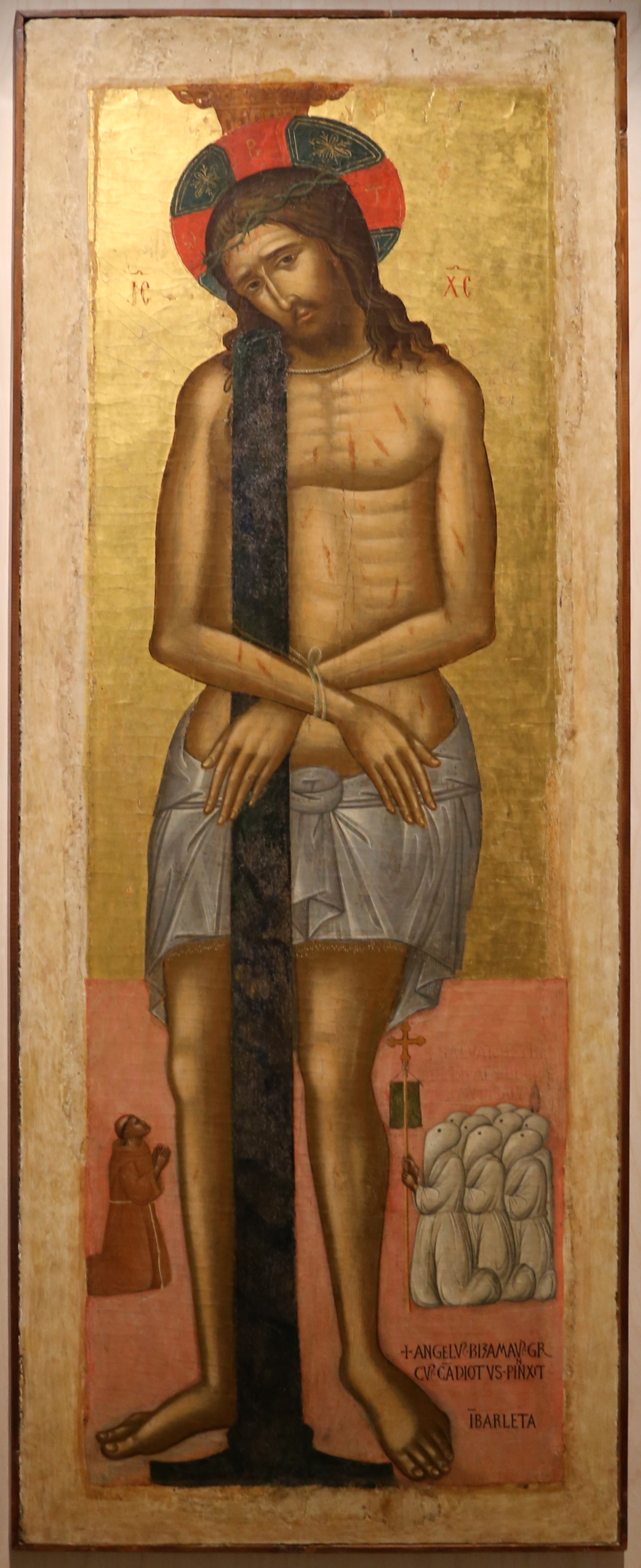
Christ on a Pole

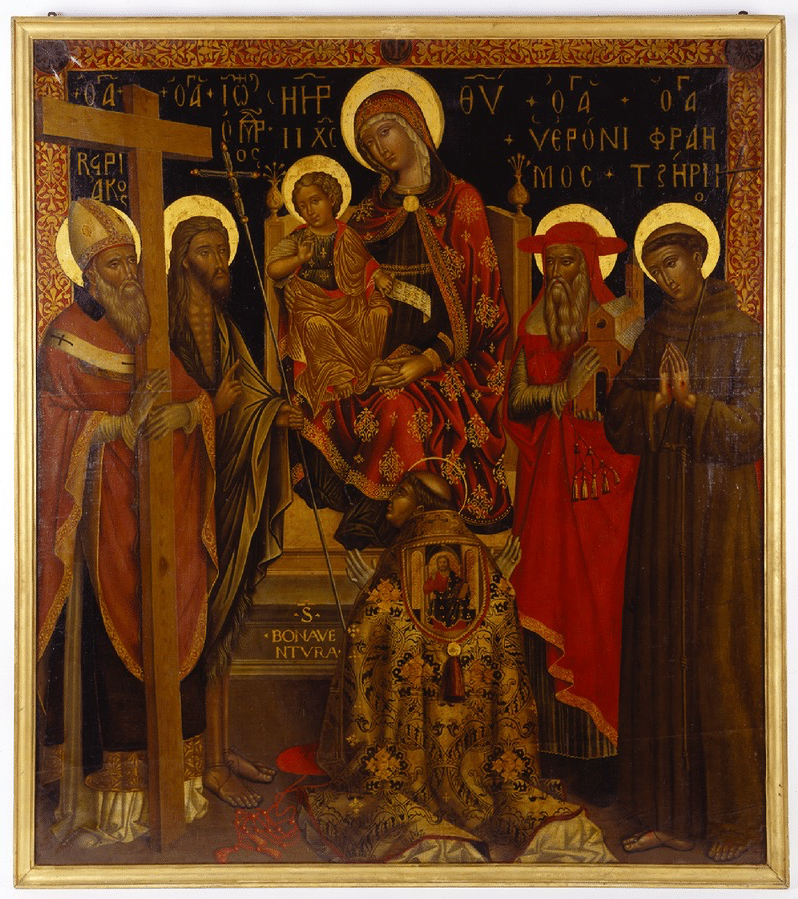
Madonna and Child

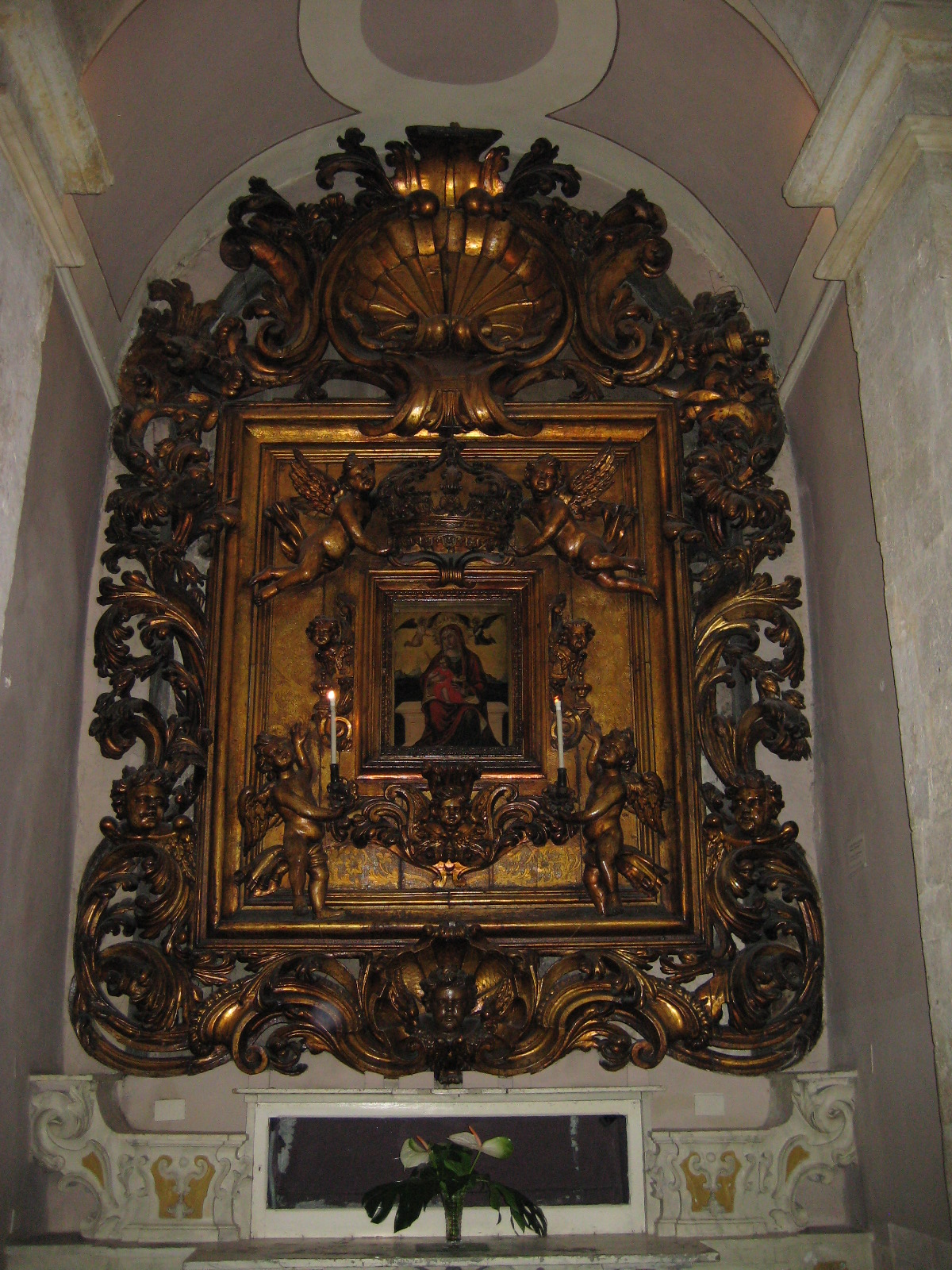
O Madonna di Costantinopoli

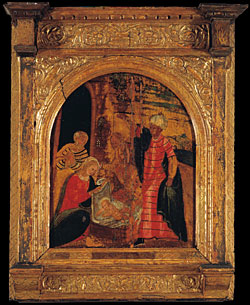
The Adoration of the Magi

== See also ==
- Greek scholars in the Renaissance
- Madonna of Constantinople

== Bibliography ==
- Hatzidakis, Manolis; Drakopoulou, Evgenia (1997). Έλληνες Ζωγράφοι μετά την Άλωση (1450–1830). Τόμος 2: Καβαλλάρος – Ψαθόπουλος [Greek Painters after the Fall of Constantinople (1450–1830). Volume 2: Kavallaros – Psathopoulos] (in Greek). Athens: Center for Modern Greek Studies, National Research Foundation. hdl:10442/14088. ISBN 960-7916-00-X.
- Mazzotta, Gabriele (1988). "Icone di Puglia e Basilicata dal Medioevo al Settecento" [Icons of Puglia and Basilicata from the Middle Ages to the Eighteenth Century] (PDF) (in Italian). Milan, Italy: Mazzotta Publishing. Archived (PDF) from the original on June 13, 2025.
- Voulgaropoulou, Margarita. 2021. “A ‘Lost’ Panel and a Missing Link: Angelos Bitzamanos and the Case of the Scottivoli Altarpiece for the Church of San Francesco delle Scale in Ancona,” Arts (SI: A 10-Year Journey of Arts), no. 3: 44 (2021). DOI: https://doi.org/10.3390/arts10030044
