= Richard G. Mann =

American art historian (born 1949)

Richard Mann
- Born: Richard George Mann; 1949 (age 76–77)

Academic background
- Education: Kalamazoo College (BA); University of Minnesota (MA); New York University (PhD)

Academic work
- Discipline: Art history
- Sub-discipline: Spanish art
- Institutions: San Francisco State University

Richard George Mann (born 1949) is an American academic who is professor emeritus of art at San Francisco State University. He is a specialist in the art of Spain.

== Early life and education ==
Mann was born in 1949. He received a Bachelor of Arts degree from Kalamazoo College in 1972, a Master of Arts from the University of Minnesota in 1974, and a Ph.D. from New York University in 1982.

== Career ==
Mann is a professor emeritus of art at San Francisco State University. He is a specialist in Spanish art. In 1986, he produced El Greco and his patrons: Three major projects, the first volume in the Cambridge Studies in the History of Art, in which he investigated three of El Greco's six major projects and the patrons responsible for them.

With Jonathan Brown he prepared the volume on Spanish paintings of the fifteenth to nineteenth centuries in the National Gallery of Art in their systematic catalogue series.

== Selected publications ==
- El Greco and his patrons: Three major projects. Cambridge University Press, Cambridge, 1986. ISBN 0521303923
- Spanish paintings of the fifteenth through nineteenth centuries, National Gallery of Art, Washington, 1990. (With Jonathan Brown) (Collections of the National Gallery of Art Systematic Catalogue) ISBN 978-0521401074
