= Enthroned Saint Anne with the Virgin and Christ Child =

Painting by Angelos Akotantos

- Η Παναγία, η Αγία Άννα και ο Χριστός (Greek), La Vergine, Sant'Anna e Cristo (Italian)
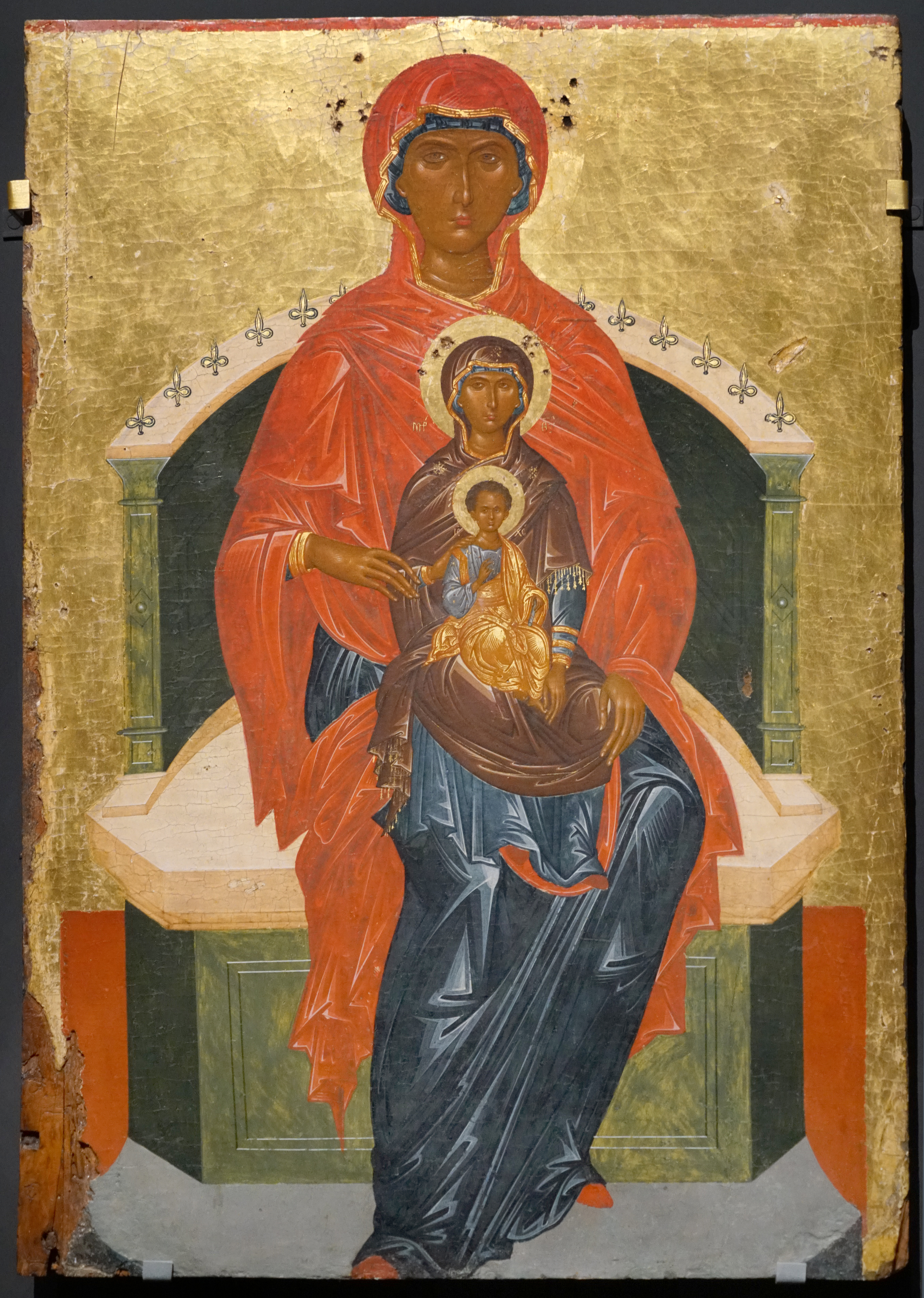
- Artist: Angelos Akotantos
- Year: c. 1425–1457
- Medium: Tempera on wood
- Movement: Cretan school
- Subject: Virgin and Child with Saint Anne
- Dimensions: 87.1 cm × 59.9 cm (34.3 in × 23.6 in)
- Location: Byzantine Museum of Zakynthos

The Enthroned Saint Anne with the Virgin and Christ Child is a painting in tempera by the Greek painter Angelos Akotantos, who flourished during the 15th century. His style was indicative of the Cretan school and he was also an educator and a protopsaltis. Among his notable students was the painter Andreas Pavias. Angelos owned a massive library, which was a reflection of his high level of education. His brother Ioannis Akotantos was also a painter. There are over 50 extant works by Angelos, 30 of which bear his signature. Most of his works follow the traditional maniera greca. Angelos Akotantos is often confused with a painter who used the name Angelos around the same period, while some historians argue that the two artists were one and the same.

According to tradition Saint Anne was the mother of Mary, the wife of Joachim, and the maternal grandmother of Christ. She is often depicted with the Virgin and Child; the trio of the Virgin and Child with Saint Anne was a common artistic theme all over Europe by the 15th century. A notable version was completed by Masaccio around the same period in 1425. Angelos produced another painting depicting Saint Anne and the Virgin Mary entitled Saint Anne with the Virgin. The Enthroned Saint Anne with the Virgin and Christ Child can be found in the Byzantine Museum of Zakynthos.

== Description ==
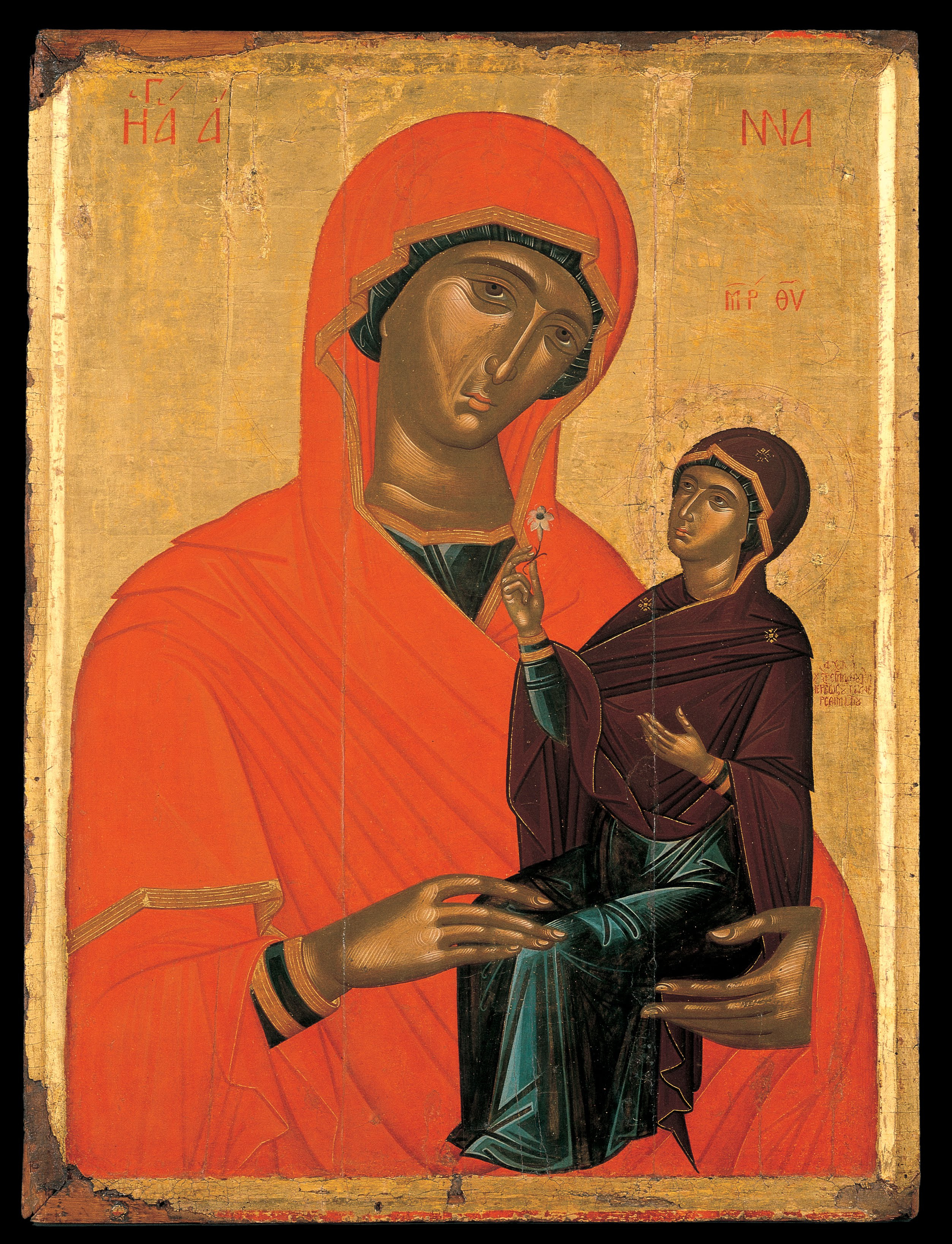
Saint Anne with the Virgin by Angelos Akotantos

The icon is made with egg tempera paint on a wood panel, with gold leaf used for the background. The height of the work is 87 cm (34.3 in) and the width is 60 cm (23.6 in). The work was completed sometime between 1425 and 1457. The painter follows the traditional Italo-Byzantine style prevalent at the time, incorporating the new, refined Cretan movement known as the Cretan Renaissance. Symbols of the fleur-de-lis adorn the upper portion of the throne, which is angled upward forming a semicircular three-dimensional arch. The majestic throne also features decorative molding in the upper and lower portions. The statuesque figure of Saint Anne is of a larger scale than those of the Virgin Mary and the Christ Child, emphasizing her importance in Christ's lineage as his maternal grandmother. The painter uses the hieratic scale, demonstrating that the smaller Virgin Mary is Anne's child while the smallest figure representing Christ is the son of Mary. The figure and attire of Mary follow the prototypical Italo-Byzantine depiction of the Virgin Mary, while Jesus is painted in a Cretan Renaissance style. The work follows the traditional maniera greca characteristic of flattened space, and striations to suggest folds of fabric, but the throne escapes the two-dimensional phenomenon creating a three-dimensional perception. The position of the Madonna and Child is the traditional Our Lady of the Sign, also known as Platitera and in Italian Nostra Signora del Segno. The position is also referred to as the Nikopoios. The work of art was moved from the Church of Agios Nikolaos Molos in Zakynthos to the Byzantine Museum of Zakynthos.

== Gallery ==
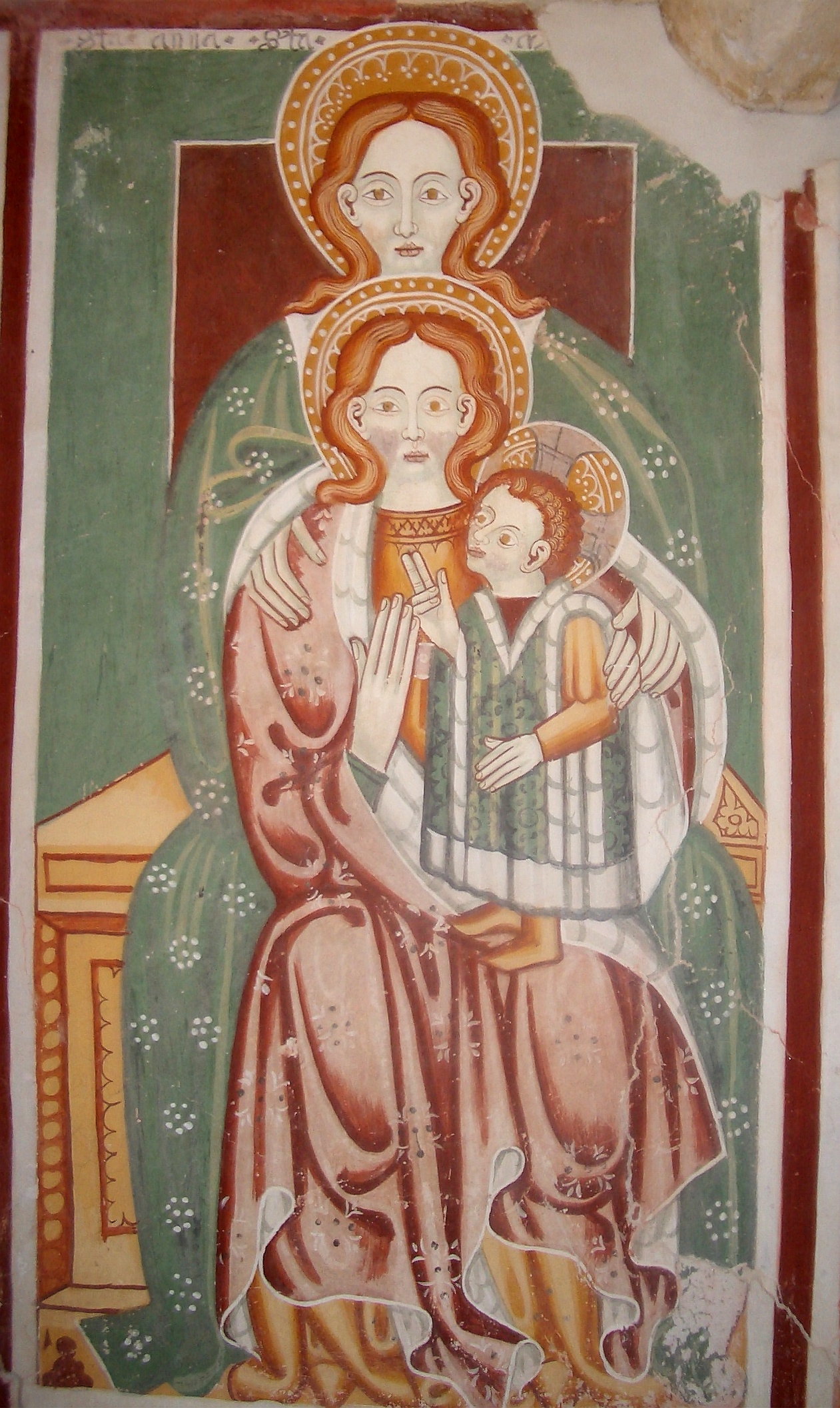
Virgin and Child with Saint Anne (15th century) by an unknown painter

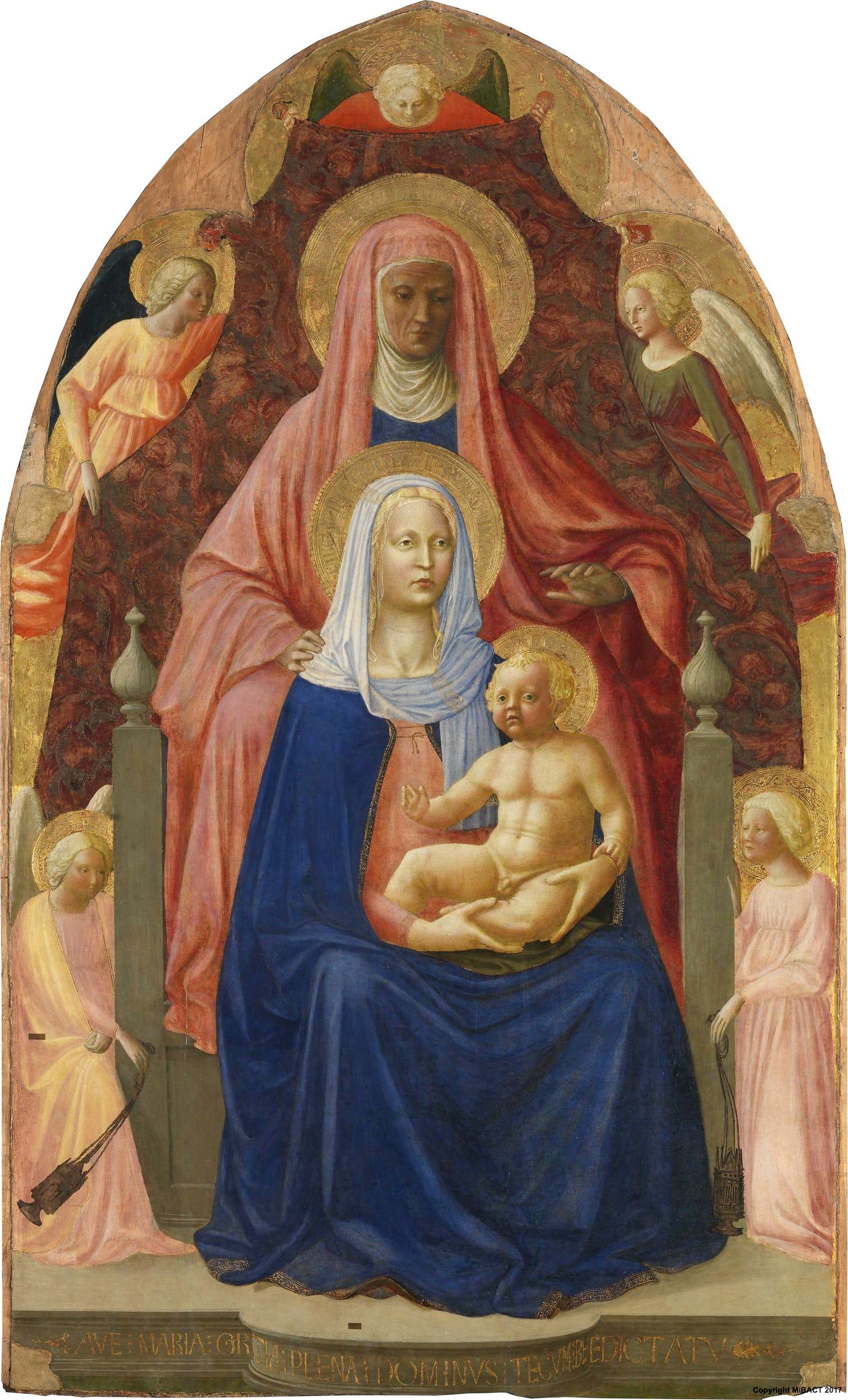
Virgin and Child with Saint Anne (1425) by Masaccio

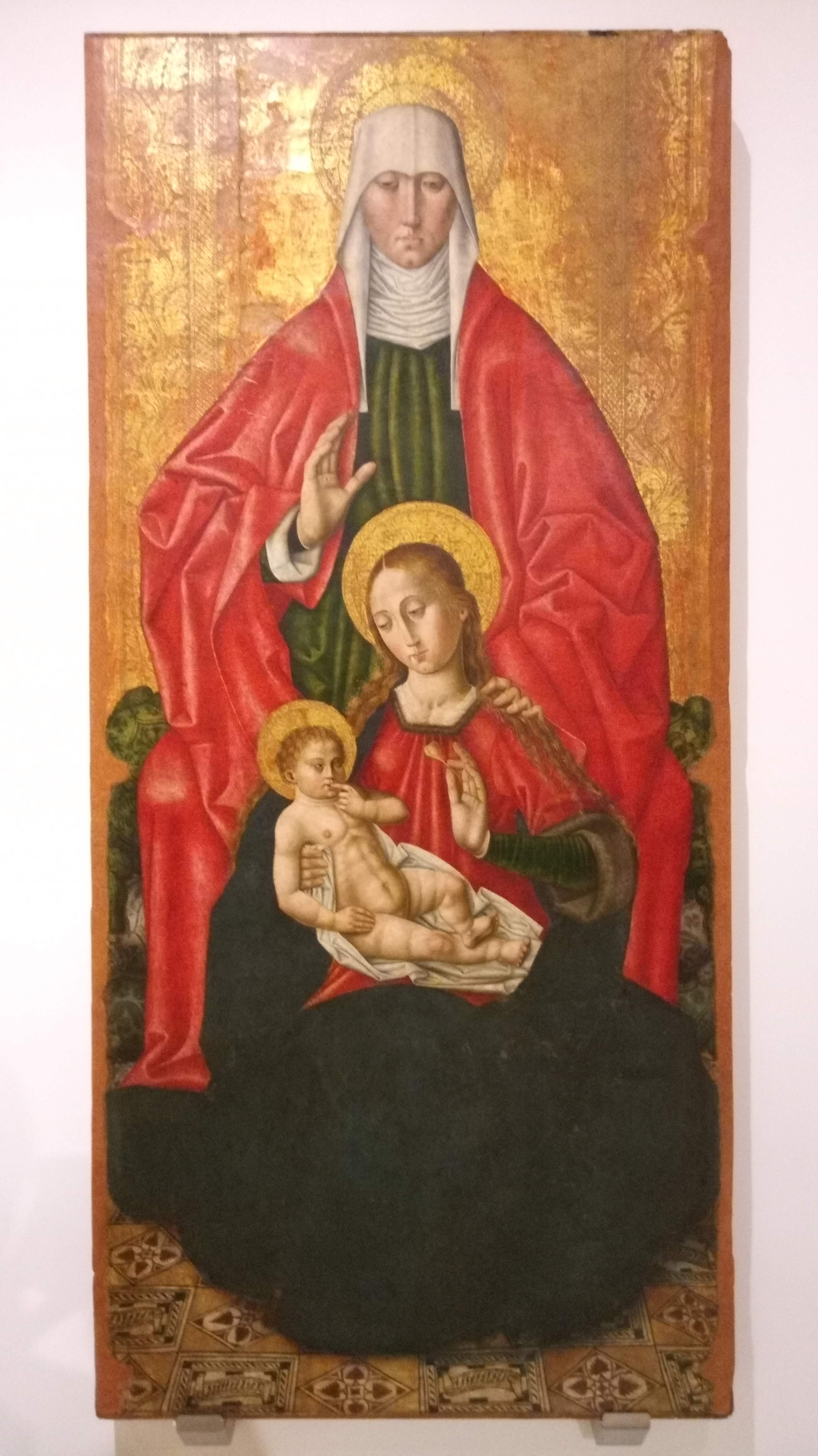
Virgin and Child with Saint Anne (1500) by Pere Terrencs

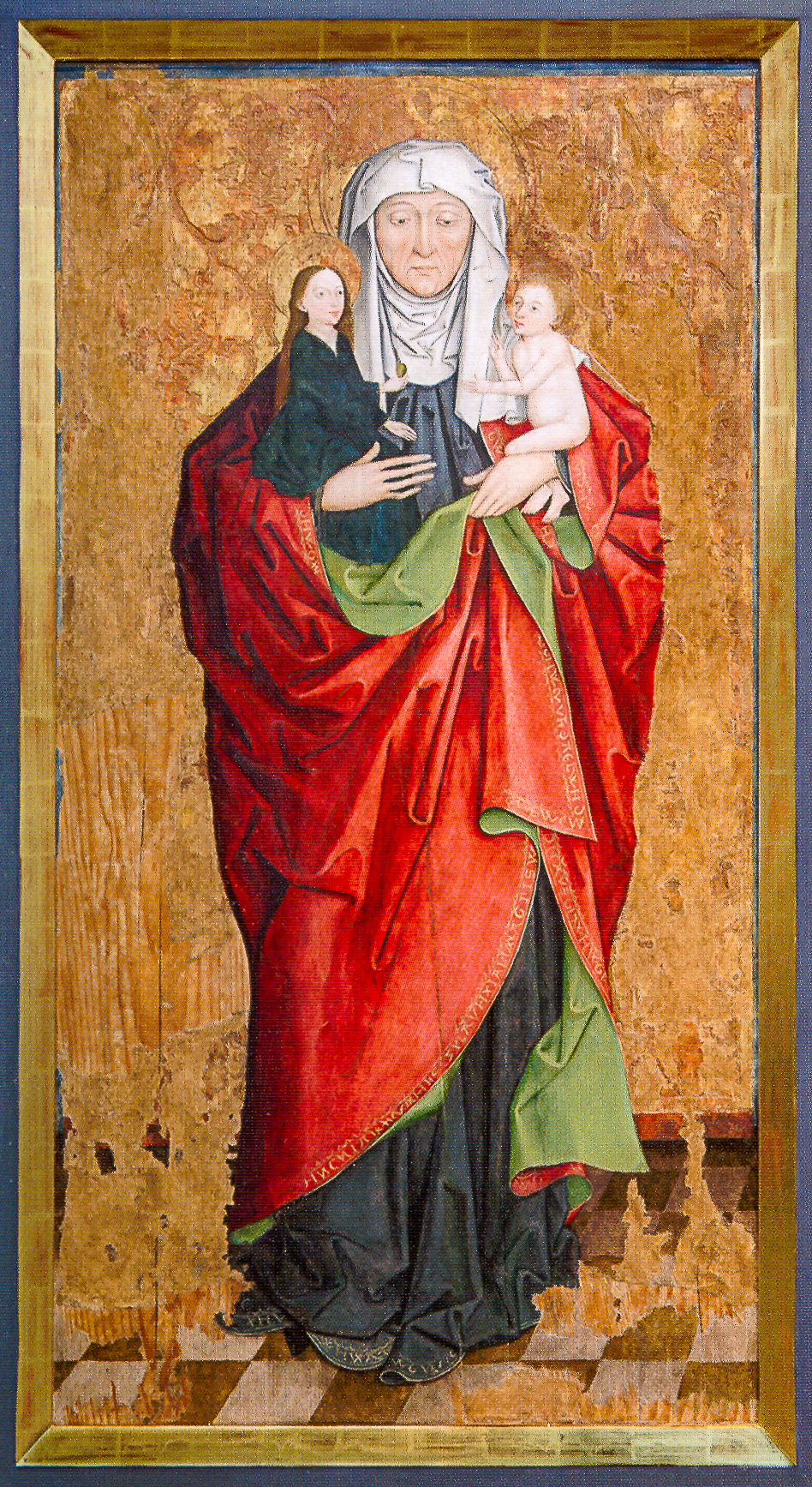
Saint Anne, the Virgin and Christ (1490) by Jörg Stocker

== See also ==
- The Virgin and Child with Saint Anne by Leonardo da Vinci

== Bibliography ==
- Ene Drăghici-Vasilescu, Elena (October 22, 2018). Heavenly Sustenance in Patristic Texts and Byzantine Iconography. New York, New York: Springer International Publishing. ISBN 9783319989860.; see also Elena (October 22, 2018). Heavenly Sustenance in Patristic Texts and Byzantine Iconography. New York, New York: Springer International Publishing. ISBN 9783319989860.; see also / Ene Drăghici-Vasilescu, Elena, Devotion to St. Anne from Byzantium to the Middle Ages (ed.), London, Basingstoke: Palgrave, 2018 (https://www.palgrave.com/gb/book/9783319893983)
- Hatzidakis, Manolis (1987). Έλληνες Ζωγράφοι μετά την Άλωση (1450–1830). Τόμος 1: Αβέρκιος – Ιωσήφ [Greek Painters after the Fall of Constantinople (1450–1830). Volume 1: Averkios – Iosif] (in Greek). Athens: Center for Modern Greek Studies, National Research Foundation. hdl:10442/14844. ISBN 960-7916-01-8.
- Herrin, Judith (March 11, 2013). Unrivalled Influence Women and Empire in Byzantium. Princeton, New Jersey: Princeton University Press. ISBN 9780691153216.
- Lymberopoulou, Angeliki (2007). "The painter Angelos and post-Byzantine art". In Richardson, Carol M. (ed.). Locating Renaissance Art. New Haven and London: Yale University Press. pp. 175–210. ISBN 978-0300121889.
- Richardson, Carol M.; Woods, Kim W.; Lymberopoulou, Angeliki (2007). Viewing Renaissance Art. New Haven and London: Yale University Press. ISBN 9780300123432.
