= Martin Schaffner (artist) =

German painter

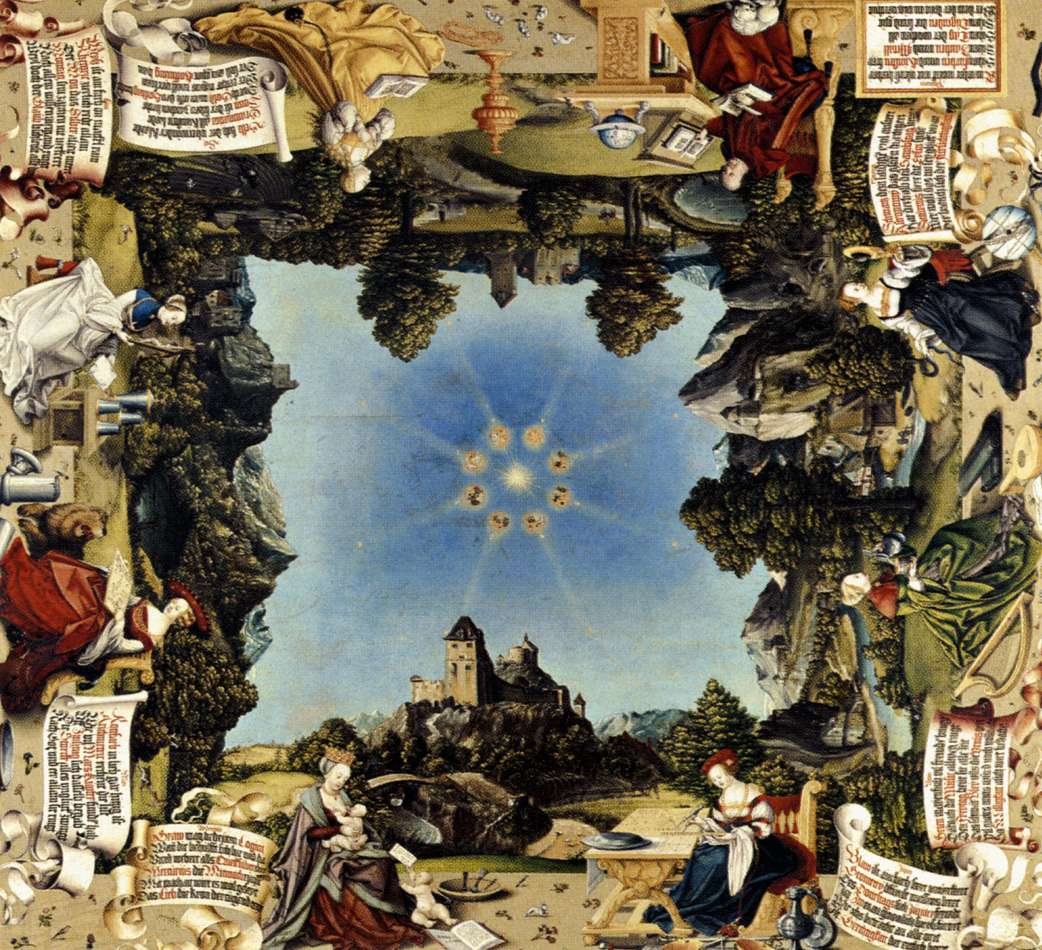
Martin Schaffner, Painted tabletop for Erasmus Stedelin, 1533

Martin Schaffner (c. 1478 – c. 1548) was a German painter and medallist.

Schaffner was born, lived and worked primarily in Ulm. His birth year is calculated based on a self-portrait medal he created in 1522 in which he describes himself as 44 years old. Schaffner initially apprenticed under Jörg Stocker. Records indicate he was a taxpaying householder in Ulm in 1499, suggesting that he had meanwhile become an independent master, free to develop along his own lines. He specialized in religious-themed works, often altar pieces. He died in Ulm in 1548.
