= Saint Anne with the Virgin =

Painting by Angelos Akotantos

Saint Anne and Mary
- Η Αγία Αννα με την Παναγία (Greek), Sant'Anna e Maria (Italian)
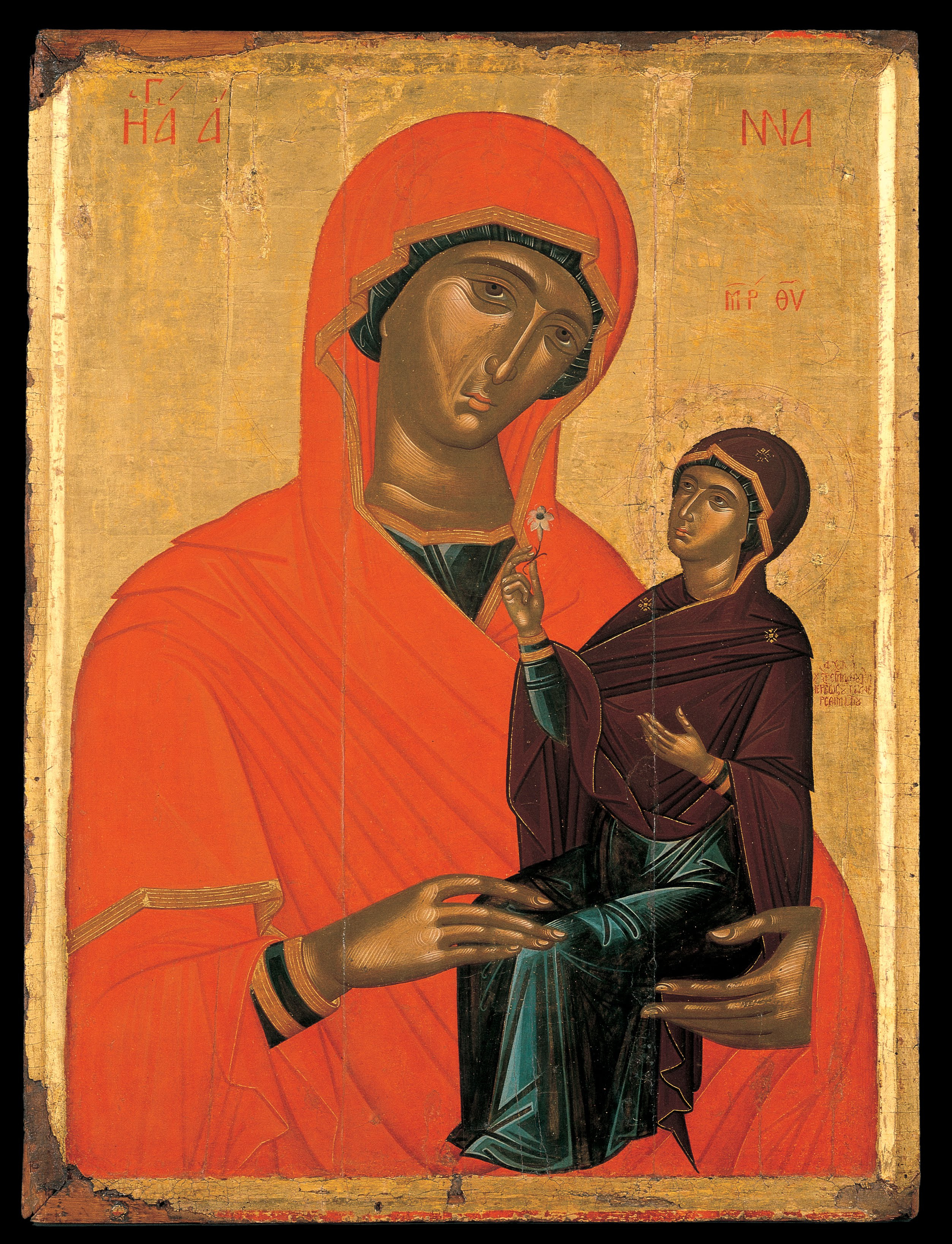
- Artist: Angelos Akotantos
- Year: c. 1425–1457
- Medium: tempera on wood
- Movement: Cretan School
- Subject: The Virgin Mary held by her mother Anne
- Dimensions: 106 cm × 76 cm (41.73 in × 29.9 in)
- Location: Benaki Museum, Athens
- Owner: Benaki Museum
- Website: Icon of St Anne with the Virgin

Saint Anne with the Virgin is a tempera painting attributed to the Greek painter Angelos Akotantos. Angelos Akotantos is one of the founding members of the Cretan School along with Andreas Ritzos, Andreas Pavias, and Nikolaos Tzafouris. Angelos Akotantos was active during the first half of the 15th century. According to the Institute of Neohellenic Research, fifty paintings are attributed to Angelos Akotantos.

Angelos was extremely educated and owned a valuable library. He was a chanter and teacher of music; the Venetian authorities appointed him protopsaltis (first chanter), an honorable position carrying a government salary. He also taught painting; some of his students were Andreas Pavias, Andreas Ritzos, Antonios Papadopoulos, and Nikolaos Tzafouris. His works have been copied for over five hundred years.

Greek painters continued the tradition of emulating the Byzantine masters. The Italian painters adopted oil painting opposing the egg tempera technique. Giorgio Vasari's famous book Lives of the Most Excellent Painters, Sculptors, and Architects commented on the technique. Vasari coined the phrase maniera greca. By the mid-1500s the style was considered the maniera greca. It was one of the first post-classical European terms for style in art. Angelos's Saint Anne with the Virgin and The Virgin Eleousa were the most copied paintings. The original Saint Anne with the Virgin is at the Benaki Museum in Athens.

== Description ==
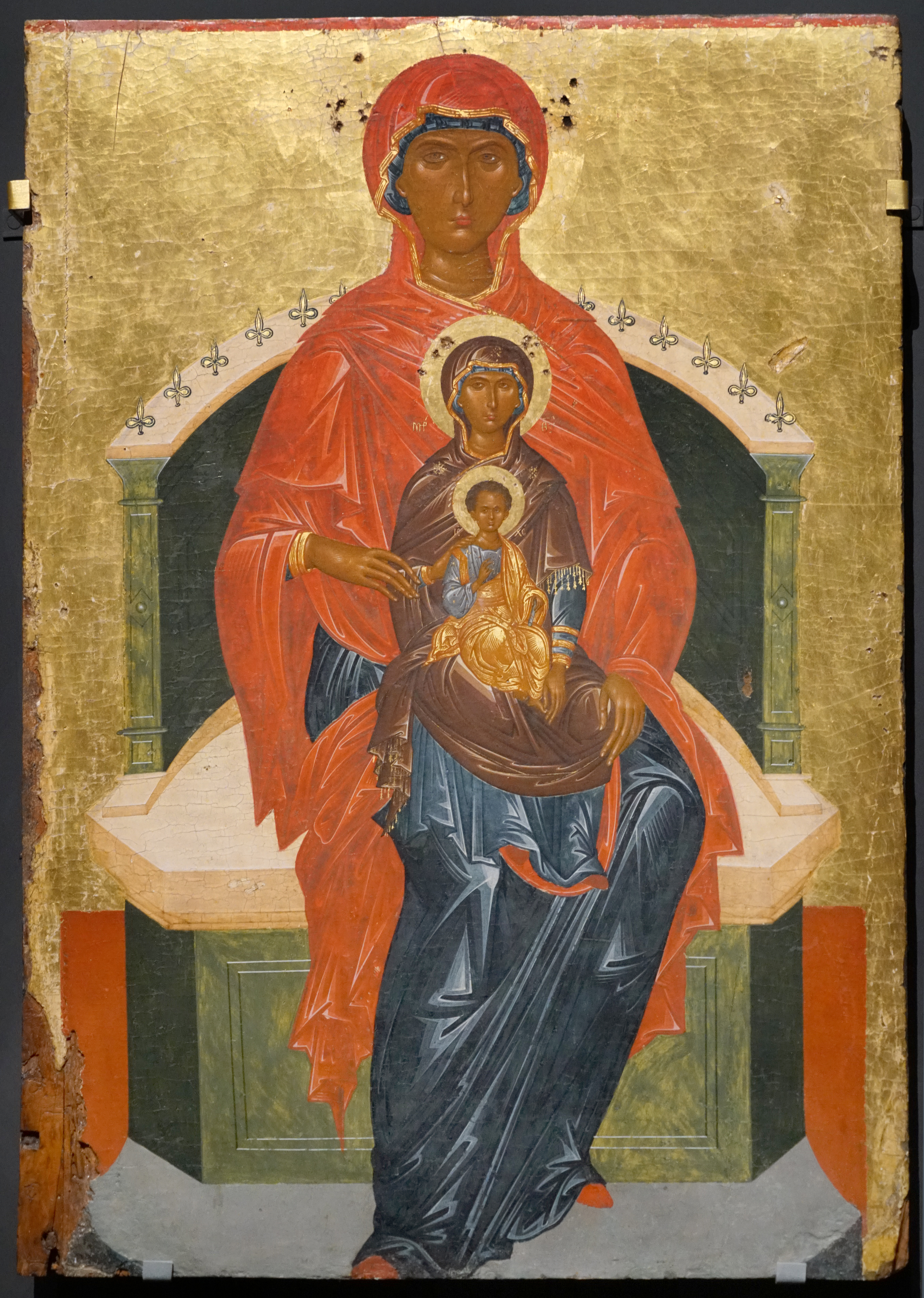
Enthroned Saint Anne with the Virgin and Christ Child

The work is an egg tempera painting with gold leaf on wood with dimensions of 105.9 cm (41.7 in) × 75.9 cm (29.9 in). The icon was finished in the early part of the 15th century. Saint Anne and the Virgin is a unique thematic interpretation of Anne and her daughter Mary. The image is comparable to the typical Virgin and Child also known as the Virgin Hodegetria. In this less frequent depiction, the Virgin takes on the role Jesus usually portrays. Her mother Saint Anne becomes the heavenly grandmother. Jesus's maternal grandmother holds her infant daughter. The young Virgin is dressed in her typical attire. The Virgin's attire is reminiscent of the typical Byzantine Greek-Italian heavenly attire.

The bright coloration reflects the painter's knowledge of the Italian Renaissance cangiante technique. Anne embraces her daughter. She glances at her viewer with motherly charm. The bright garment she wears features striations. The viewers can easily establish the grooves in the different garments. The bright garment Anne is wearing features ornate gold patterns. The shirt cuff and undershirt are clearly visible. Her headdress is also clearly defined. The young Virgin Mary looks up at her mother, and in her right hand she holds up a sacred lily.

Legend states that when the archangel Gabriel appeared to the Virgin Mary in the Annunciation, he held a lily in his hand in recognition of Mary's purity. Gabriel told the Virgin that she had "found favor with God" and would bear a son and name him Jesus. When Mary touched the scentless flower a magnificent fragrance arose. The miraculous flower blossomed outside her window when she accepted her fate and God's plan. She uttered the words to the angel Gabriel "Here am I, the servant of the Lord".

== Bibliography ==
- Drandaki, Anastasia (2014). A Maniera Greca: Content, Context and Transformation of a Term" Studies in Iconography Volume 35. Princeton, New Jersey: Index of Christian Art, Princeton University. pp. 39–72.
- Hatzidakis, Manolis (1987). Έλληνες Ζωγράφοι μετά την Άλωση (1450–1830). Τόμος 1: Αβέρκιος – Ιωσήφ [Greek Painters after the Fall of Constantinople (1450–1830). Volume 1: Averkios – Iosif] (in Greek). Athens: Center for Modern Greek Studies, National Research Foundation. hdl:10442/14844. ISBN 960-7916-01-8.
- Ene D-Vasilescu, Elena (October 22, 2018). Heavenly Sustenance in Patristic Texts and Byzantine Iconography. New York, New York: Springer International Publishing. ISBN 9783319989860.
