= The Virgin Eleousa =

Painting by Angelos Akotantos

- Παναγία Ελεούσα (Greek), La Madonna Eleusa (Italian)
- Artist: Angelos Akotantos
- Year: c. 1425–1457
- Medium: tempera on wood
- Movement: Cretan School
- Subject: Virgin and Child in the Eleousa Position
- Dimensions: 96 cm × 70 cm (37.7 in × 27.5 in)
- Location: Cleveland Museum of Art, Cleveland, OH
- Owner: Leonard C. Hanna, Jr. Fund
- Website: The Virgin Eleousa

The Virgin Eleousa is a tempera painting attributed to Angelos Akotantos. Angelos Akotantos was a Greek painter active on the island of Crete during the first half of the 15th century. He is considered one of the founding members of the Cretan School along with Andreas Pavias, Andreas Ritzos, and Nikolaos Tzafouris. Over fifty paintings are attributed to Angelos Akotantos. His works served as a prototype for Greek paintings for over five hundred years. Angelos Akotantos was active in Heraklion. He was very wealthy. Much of the information about his life was drawn from a will written in 1436. Historians consider him to have been active between 1425 and 1457. Angelos Akotantos completed many icons of the Virgin and Child in the Eleousa position.

The Eleousa position was drawn from Byzantine prototypes. The style was used by both Greek and Italian painters during the period predating the Italian and Cretan Renaissance. The Greek painters continued the tradition of emulating the Byzantine masters while Italian painters adopted oil painting as opposed to egg tempera. Giorgio Vasari commented on the technique in his famous book Lives of the Most Excellent Painters, Sculptors, and Architects. In his book, Vasari coined the phrase maniera greca. By the 1500s, Angelos Akotantos and his contemporaries painted in the maniera greca. Many of the icon painters chose to emulate Angelos Akotantos, strictly adhering to the traditional maniera greca painting style. Angelos's The Virgin Eleousa and Saint Anne with the Virgin were the most copied paintings. The original Virgin Eleousa is at the Cleveland Museum of Art in Cleveland, Ohio.

== Description ==
The work is in egg tempera and gold leaf on wood with dimensions of 96 cm (37.7 in) × 70 cm (27.5 in). The painting was finished in the early part of the 15th century. The prototype was used during the Byzantine period. Both Greek and Italian artists followed the style. The Virgin is leaning to the left as she embraces the infant. Her face and neck are elongated. She has a unique headdress under her cloak. There are three stars on her robe. The three stars are taken from traditional Greek Byzantine and Italian prototypes. The robe is also elaborately decorated around the infant's legs. His robe features detailed striations clearly defining the space. Her fingers are long; her right hand holds the Christ Child. Her elaborately decorated shirt cuff appears on her right arm. Her lips are a rose color. Her eyes give a serious glance to the viewer. Her chin embraces the young infant in the Eleousa position.

The infant faces his mother. His lips are the same color as hers. His head is tilted back slightly as his mother caresses the holy infant. His hair is brown. The infant wears an orange robe and a white baby shirt with decorations. His orange robe features elaborately painted striations allowing viewers to establish the grooves and ridges. In his hands he holds a scroll, which represents the New Testament. The gilded background allows viewers to connect with the Virgin and Child. The gold symbolizes opulence and power.

== Gallery ==
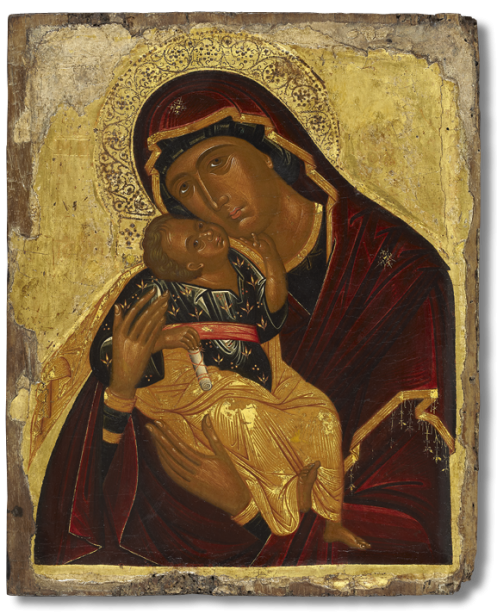
Similar Eleousa Virgin by Angelos Akotantos

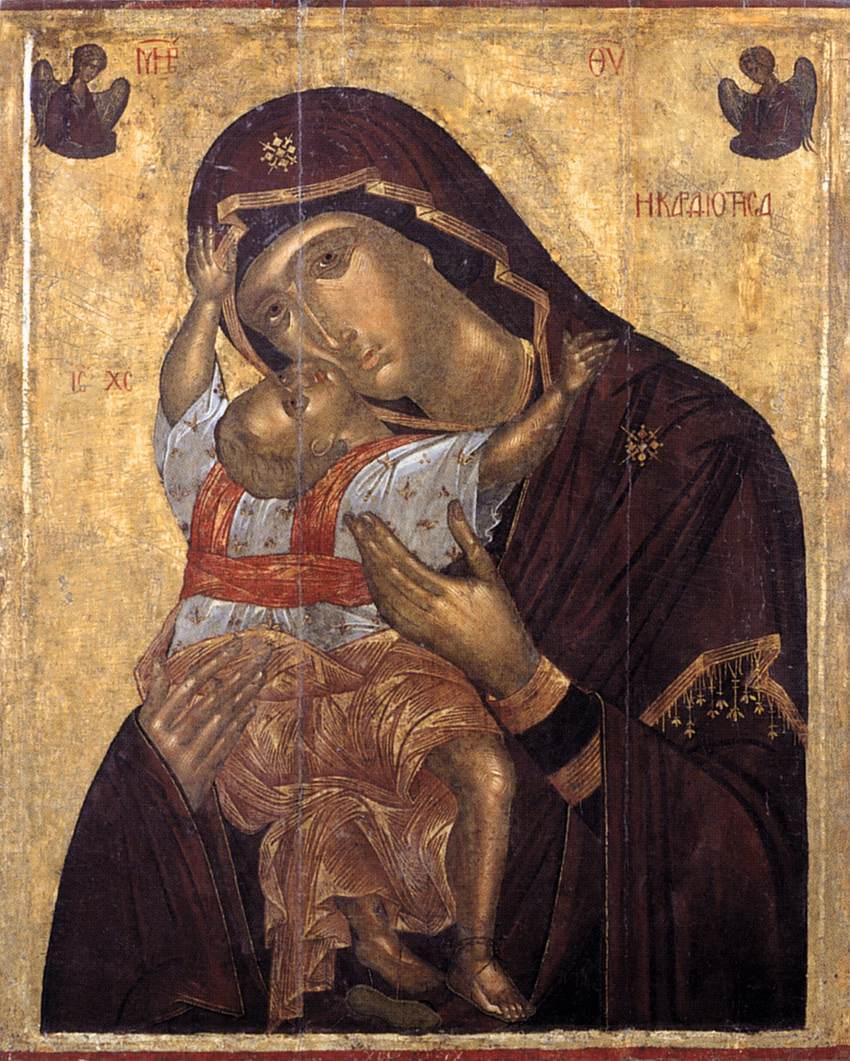
Similar Eleousa Virgin by Angelos Akotantos

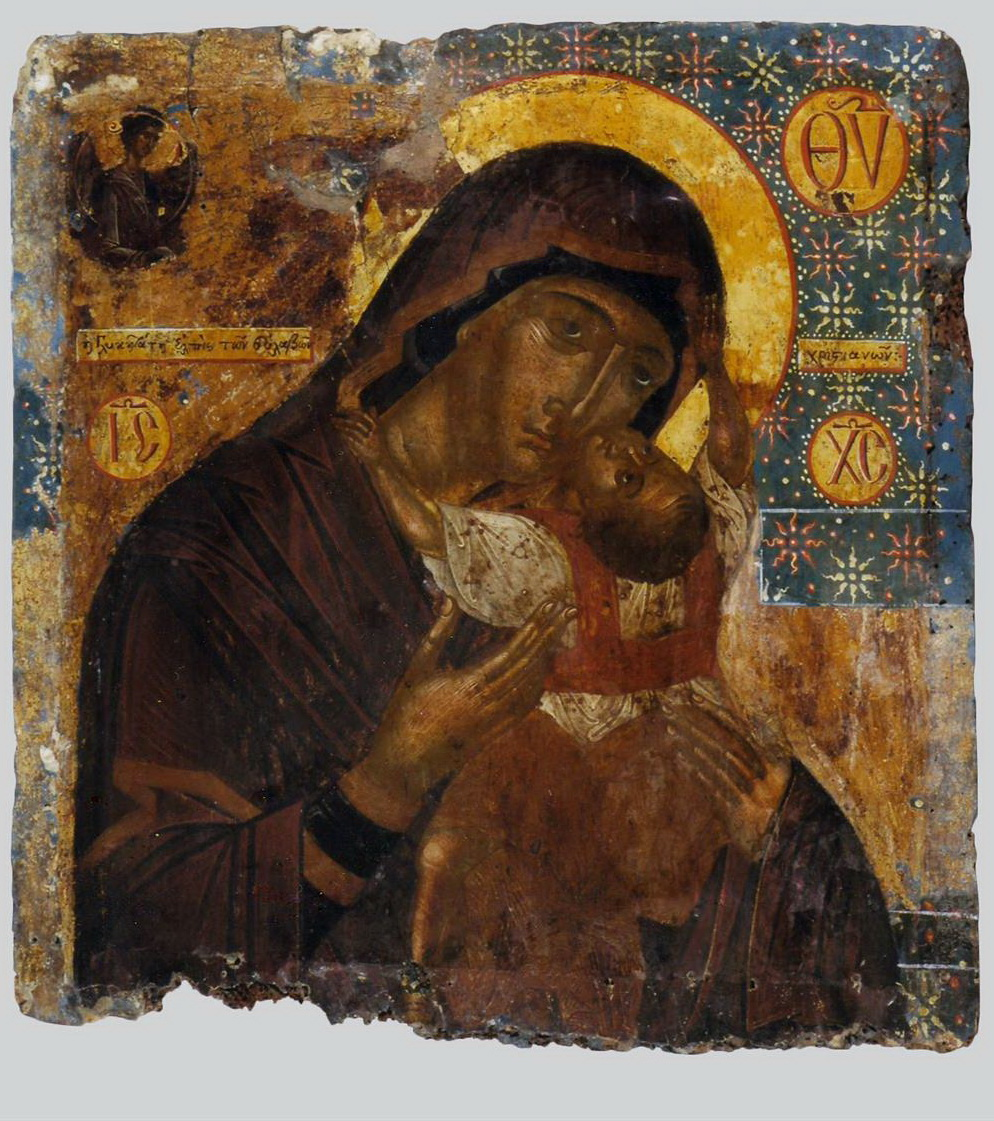
Similar Eleousa Virgin by Angelos Akotantos

== See also ==
- Virgin Nikopoios

== Bibliography ==
- Bidwell, Frederick E. (2014). The CMA Companion A Guide to the Cleveland Museum of Art. Cleveland, OH: Cleveland Museum of Art. ISBN 9781857598919.
- Drandaki, Anastasia (2014). A Maniera Greca: Content, Context and Transformation of a Term" Studies in Iconography Volume 35. Princeton, New Jersey: Index of Christian Art, Princeton University. pp. 39–72.
