= Angelos Akotantos =

Greek painter and educator (1390–1457)

Angelos
- The Virgin Eleousa (Cleveland Museum of Art)
- Born: 1390; Crete, Republic of Venice
- Died: 1457 (aged 66–67); Heraklion, Republic of Venice
- Known for: Iconography and hagiography
- Notable work: The Virgin Cardiotissa, The Congregation of the Archangels, Sts Peter and Paul, Deisis, St. Phanourios killing the Dragon
- Movement: Cretan school
- Spouse: Eleni Marmara
- Years active: 1425–1457
- Era: 15th century
- Style: Maniera Greca

Angelos Akotantos (Greek: Άγγελος Ακοτάντος; 1390–1457) was a Greek painter, educator, and protopsaltis. He painted icons in the maniera greca, at a time when that style was moving away from the traditions of the Byzantine Empire and towards the more refined aesthetic of the Cretan school. Akotantos taught painting to Andreas Pavias, Andreas Ritzos, and Antonios Papadopoulos, and his style influenced later artists such as Georgios Klontzas, Theophanes the Cretan, Michael Damaskinos and El Greco. Angelos's brother Ioannis was also a famous painter. There are 50 extant paintings reliably attributed to Akotantos, 30 of which bear his signature.

== History ==
Angelos Akotantos was born in Crete. He had a sister and two brothers; one of the latter was the famous painter Ioannis Akotantos. Much information about Angelos's life is drawn from the will he composed in 1436, in advance of a planned journey to Constantinople. The document is now housed in the State Archives of Venice. At the time of writing, Angelos was married to Eleni Marmara and they were expecting their first child. He was relatively wealthy with a significant number of possessions.

Angelos enjoyed a high level of education—as demonstrated by his ability to write his own will—and owned a big and valuable library. He specified that if his child died young the books in this library should be sold and the money raised should go to charities of his choice. Alongside his painting activities, he was a chanter and teacher of music; the Venetian authorities appointed him protopsaltis (first chanter), an honorable position carrying a government salary.

He was familiar with the monastic superior of Saint Phanourios at Versamonero, and the will grants the institution a sum of money to hold memorial services after his death. He also had a relationship with the monastery of Saint Catherine, leaving them an icon of the eponymous saint.

Akotantos's paintings are extremely popular and his style has been copied by many icon painters. Copies of his paintings can be found in churches and private collections all over the world namely Greece. One church that exhibits a copy of an Akotantos painting is the Church of St. Symeon, Mytilene. They have Saint Anne with the Virgin.

Akotantos was one of the most important Greek painters of the first half of the 15th century. The center of Byzantine art was transferred from the capital of the Constantinople to Heraklion because of the fall of Constantinople in 1453. He supplied icons to Greek churches and monasteries on Crete, Patmos, Rhodes, and elsewhere. Akotantos painted icons of Saint Phanourios killing the dragon, similar to Saint George, a local tradition found in the icons of the 15th century in Crete. Many scholars believe that the famous painter Angelos who is responsible for countless paintings is actually Akotantos. He inspired countless painters and most of his work is emulated even today.

== Gallery ==
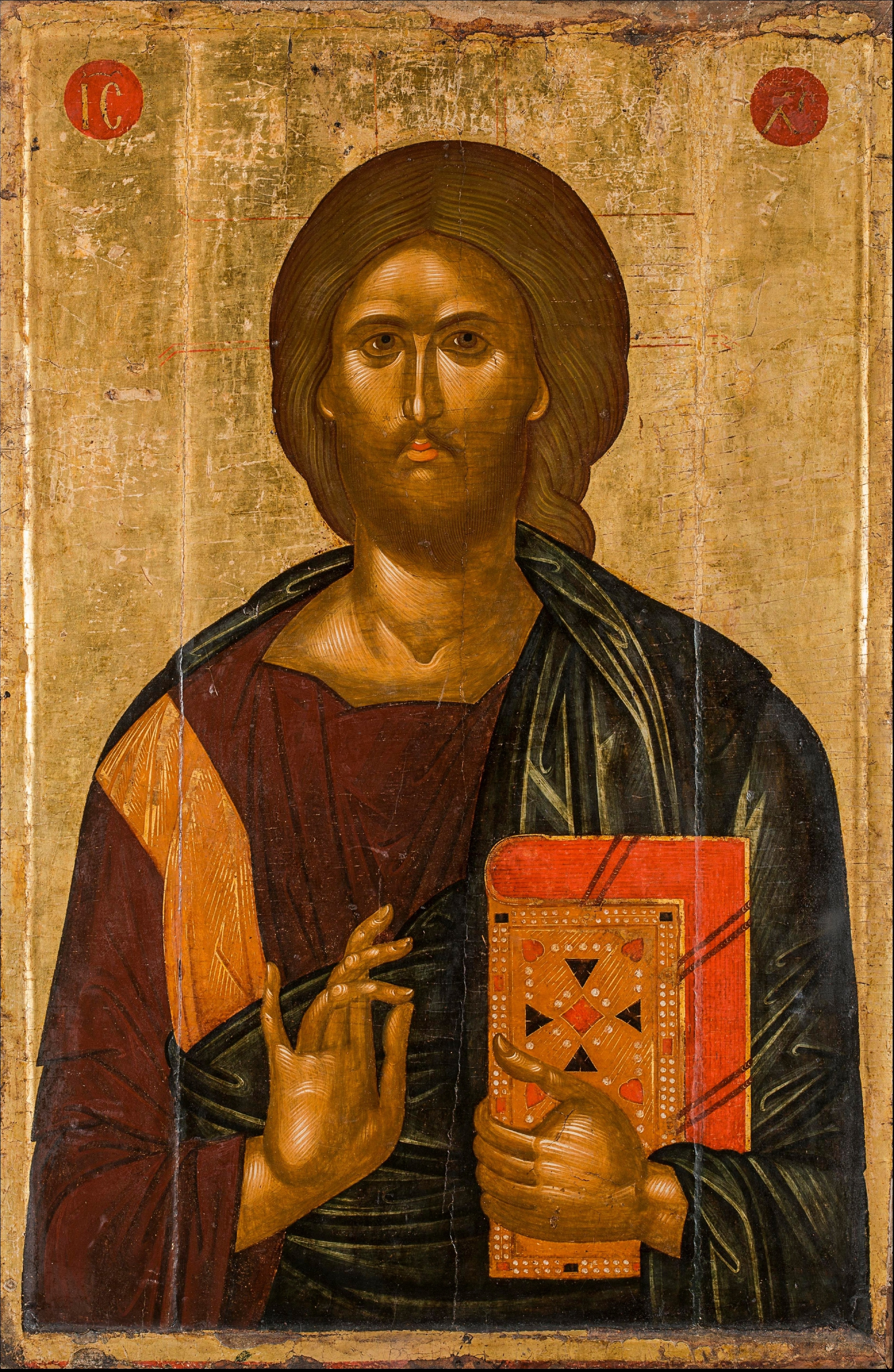
Christ Pantocrator

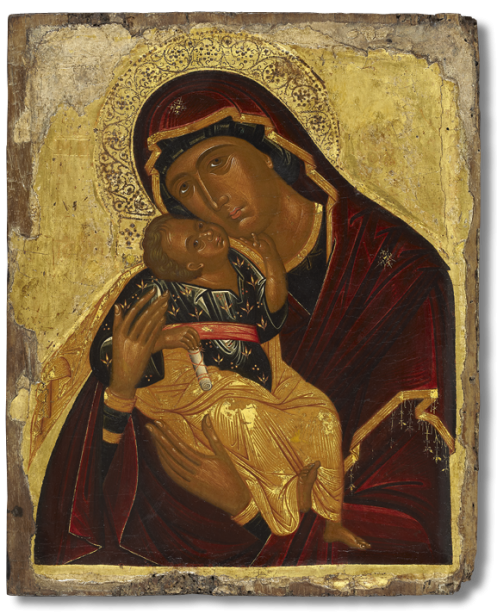
The Virgin and Child (Panagia Glykophilousa)

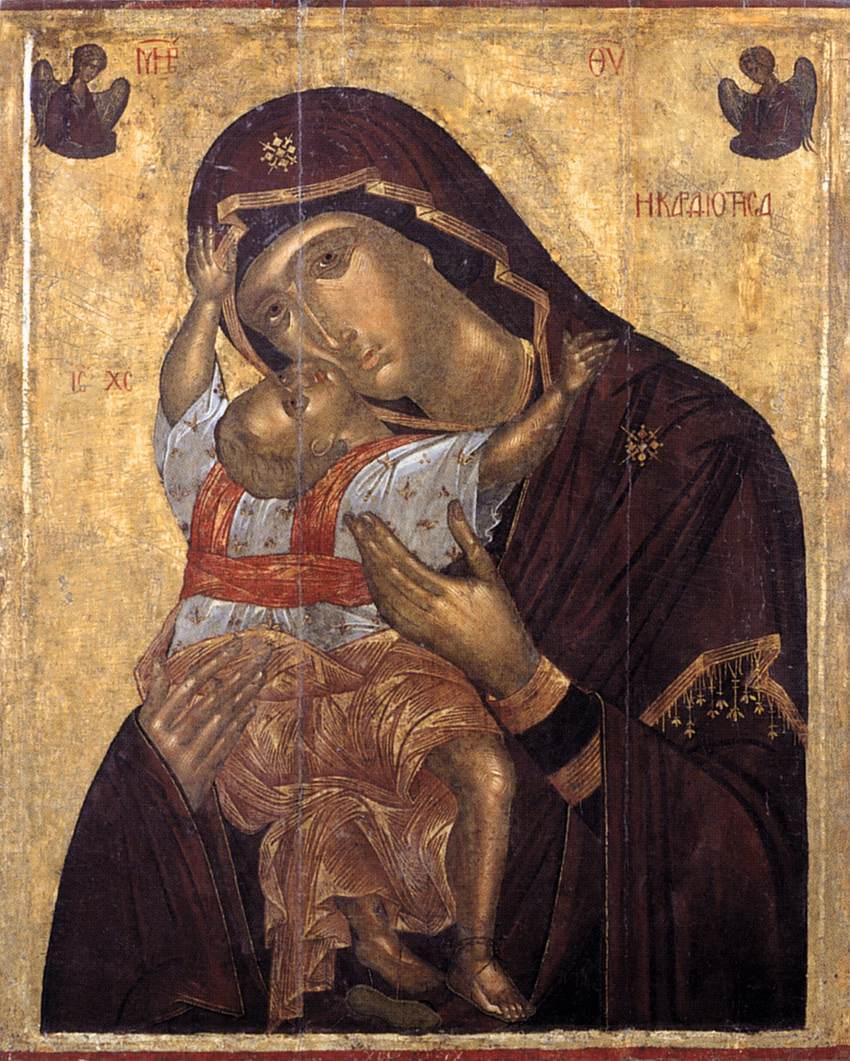
The Virgin Cardiotissa

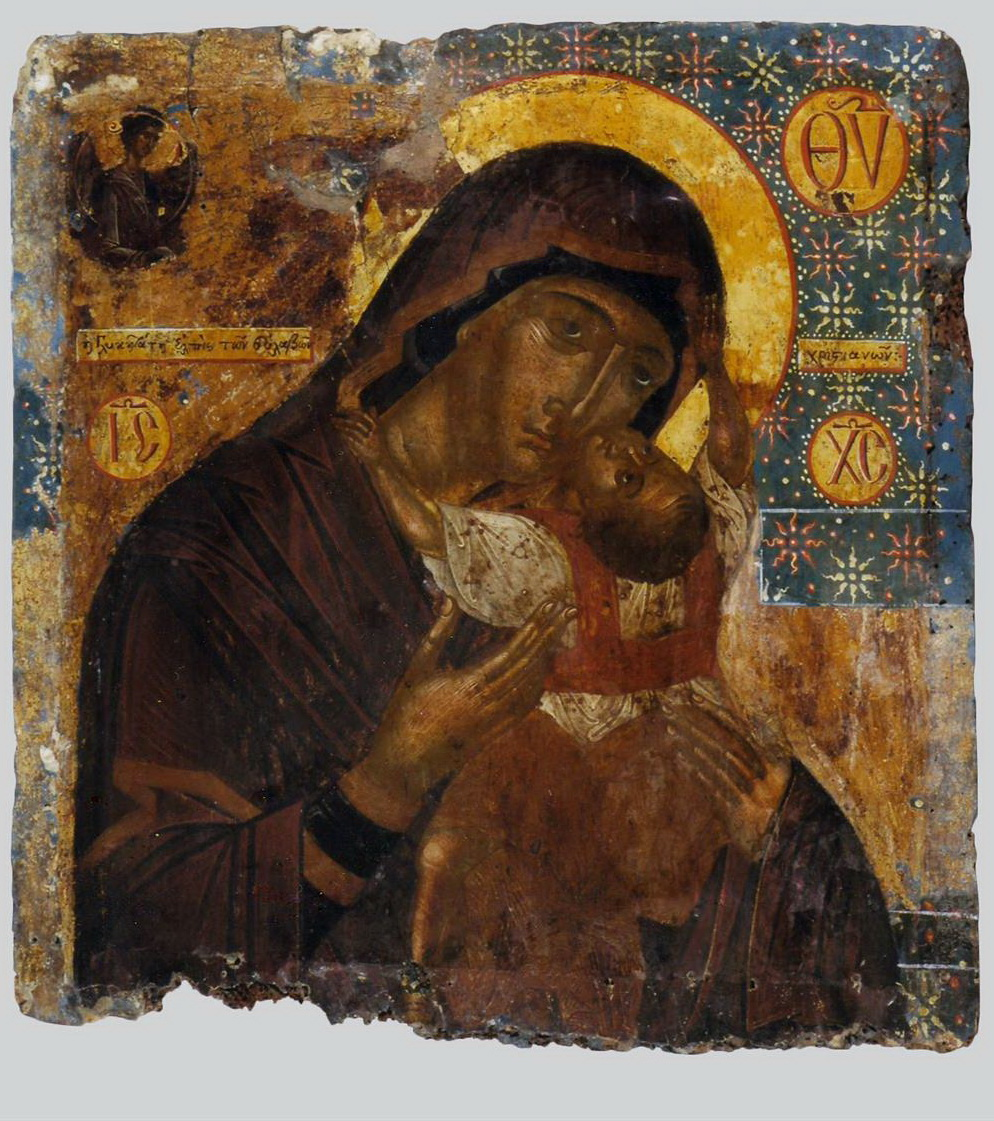
The Virgin and Child

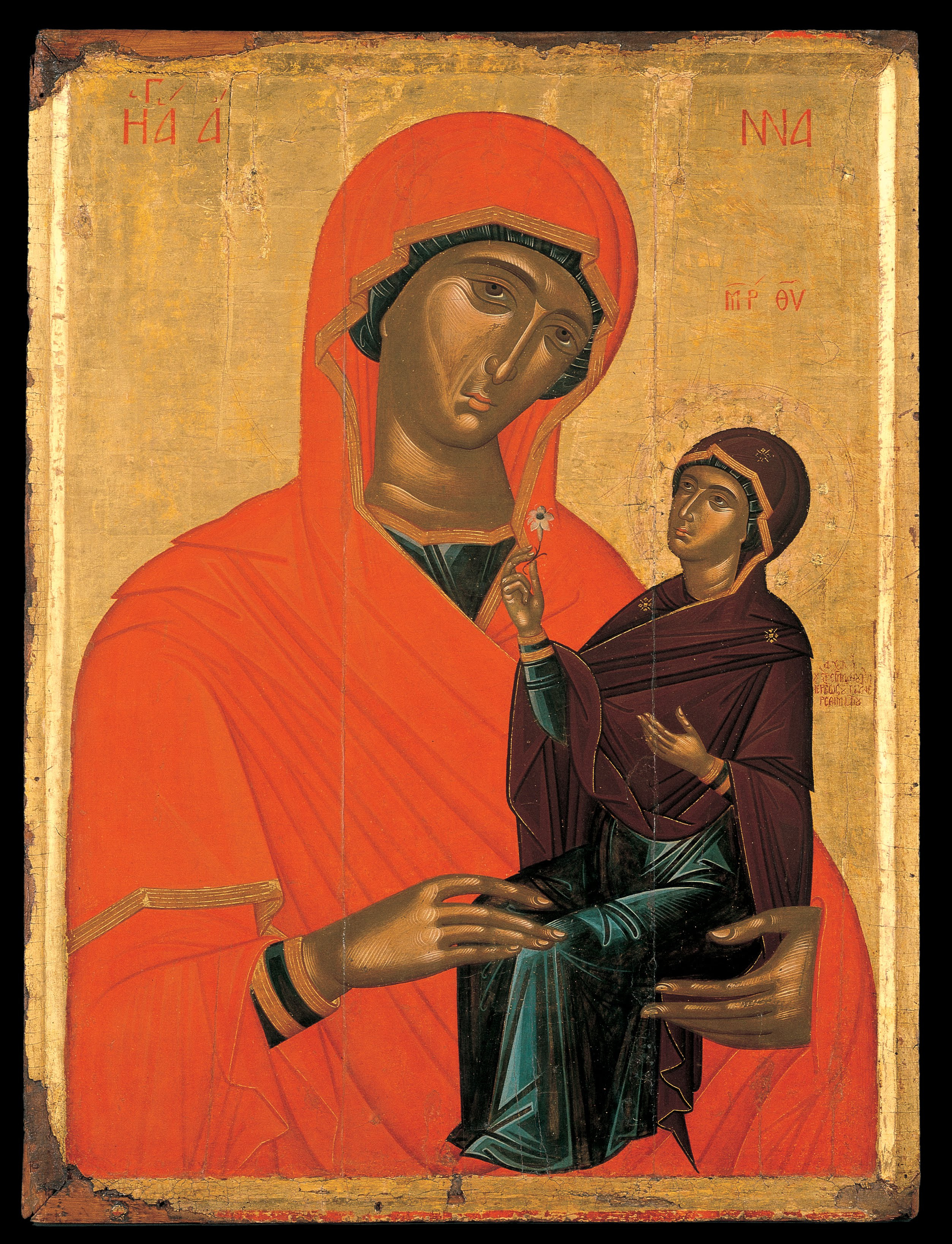
Saint Anne with the Virgin

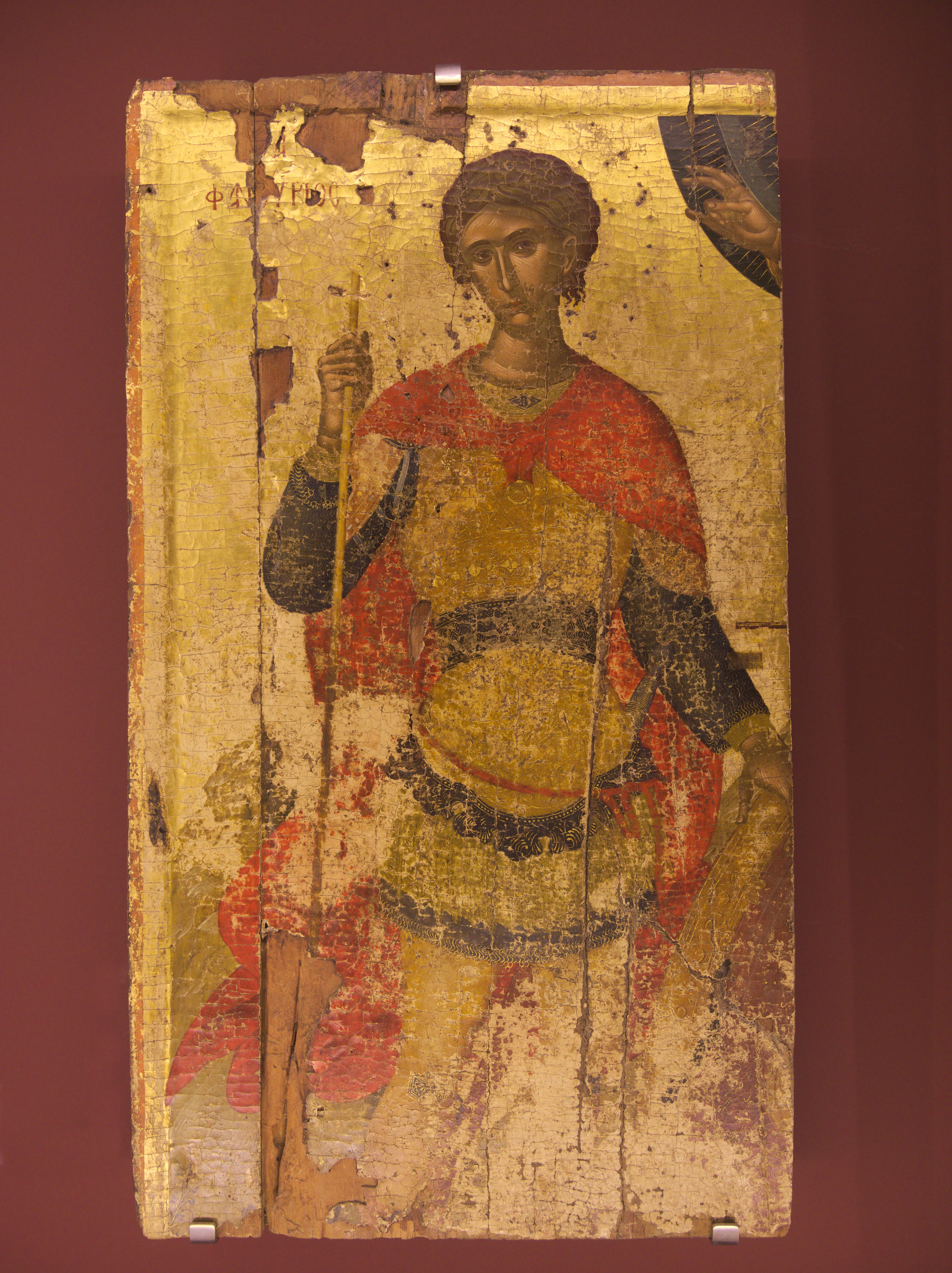
Saint Fanourious

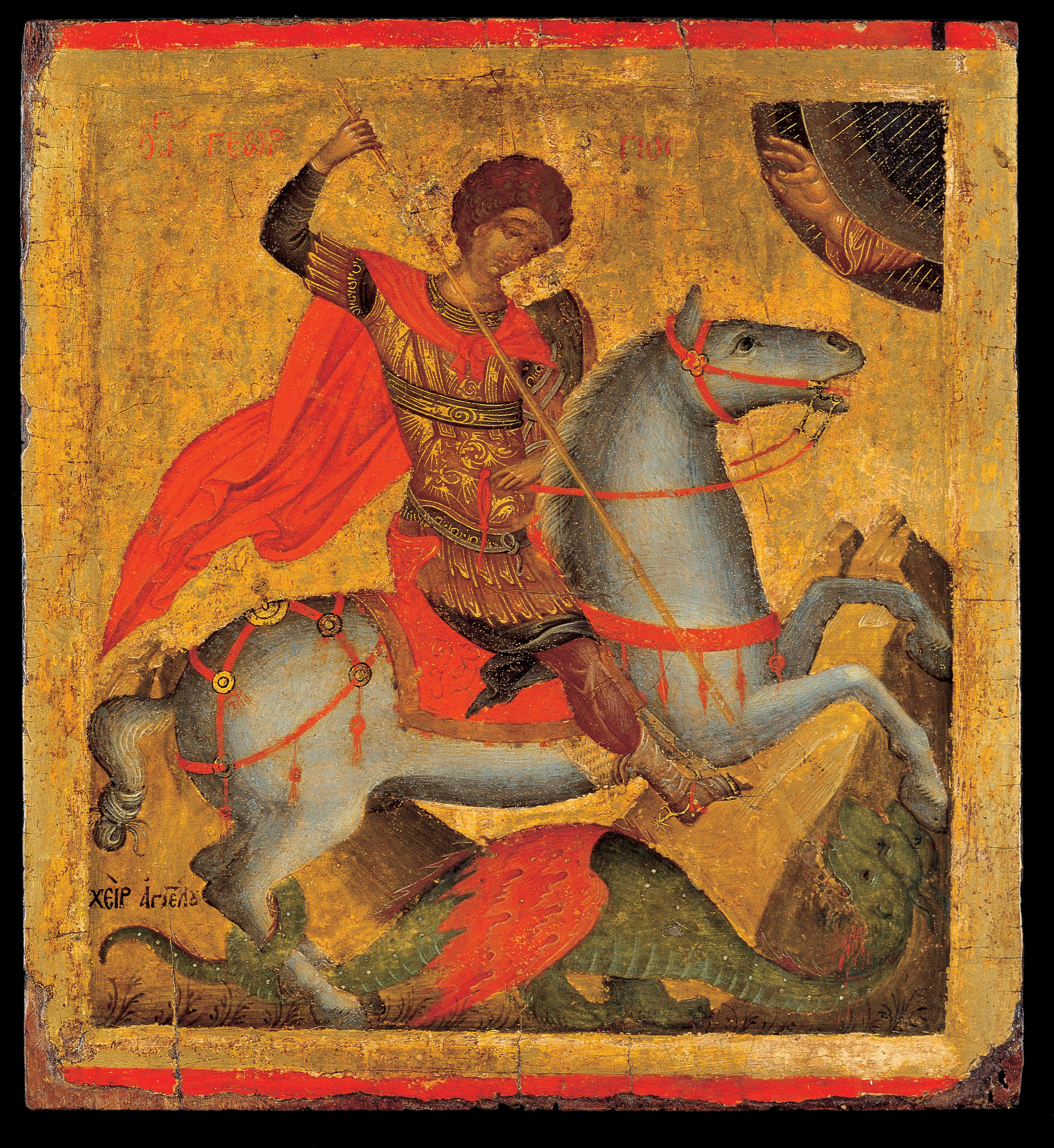
St George on Horseback, Slaying the Dragon

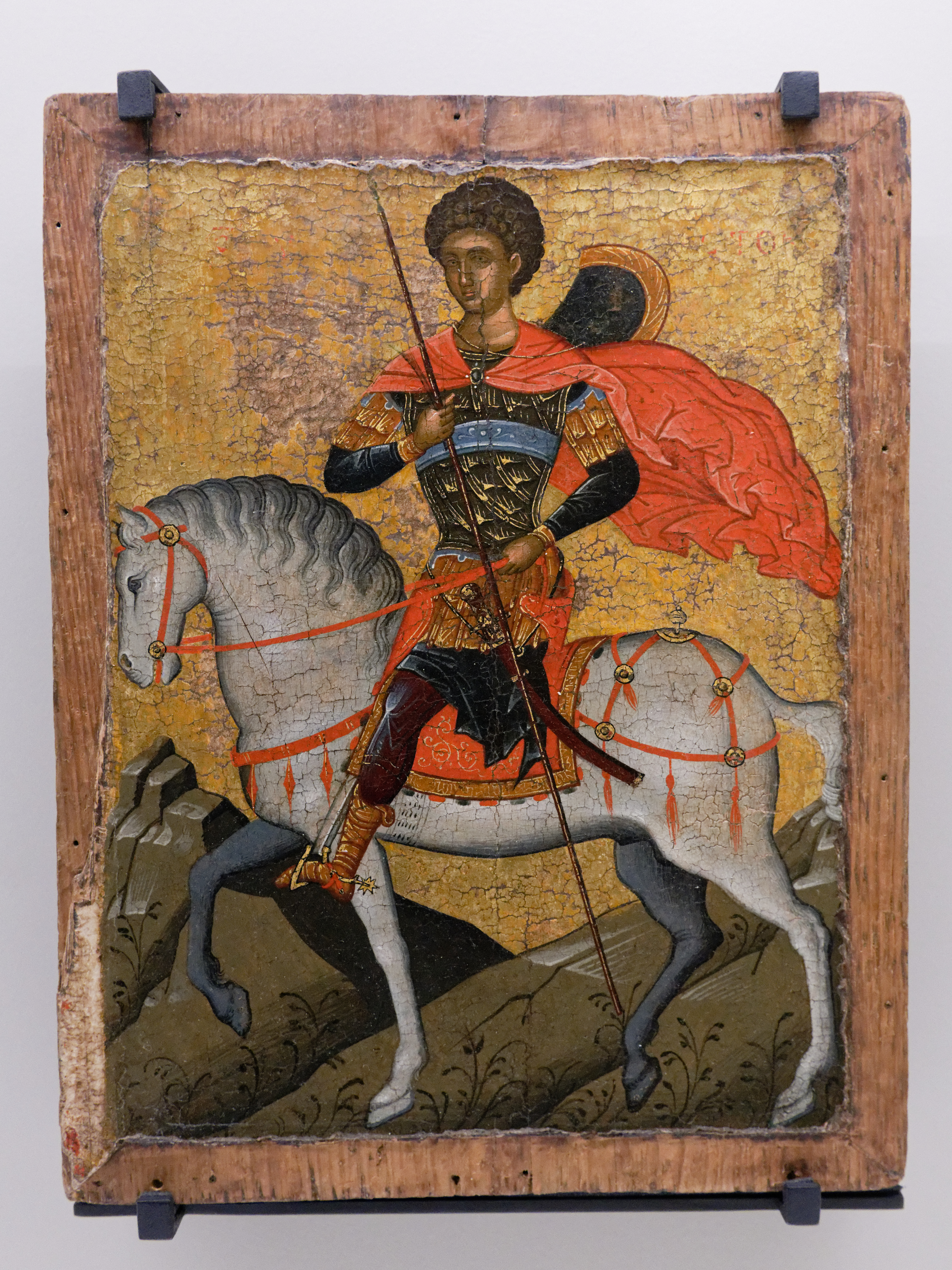
St George (Louvre, Paris)

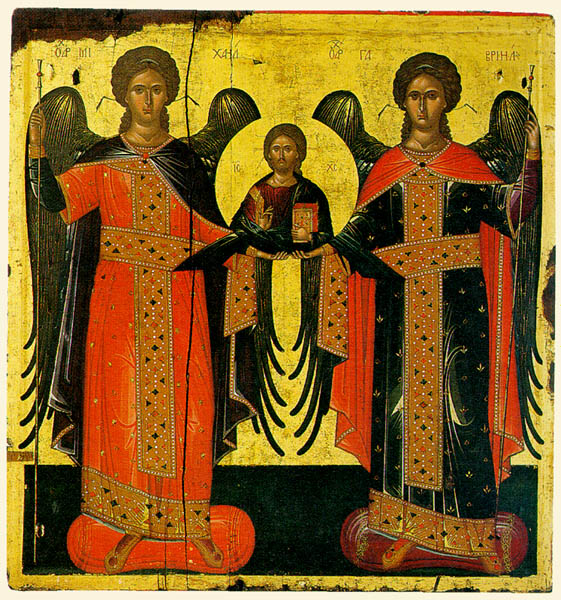
Congregation of the Archangels

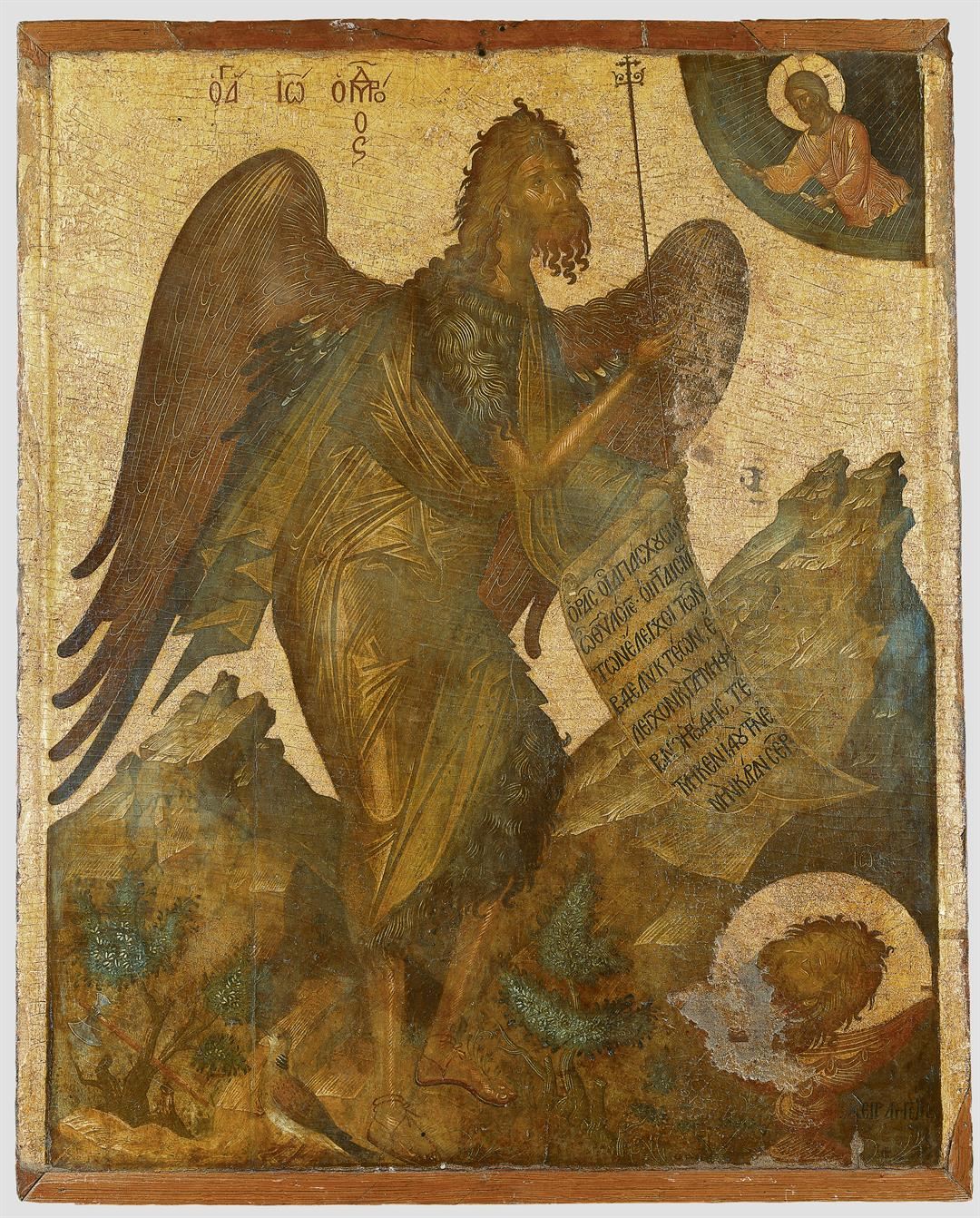
John the Baptist

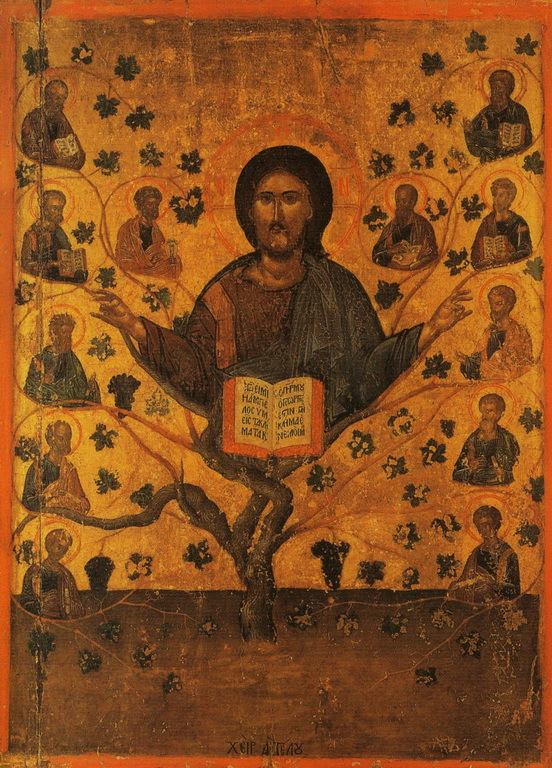
Tree of Jesus

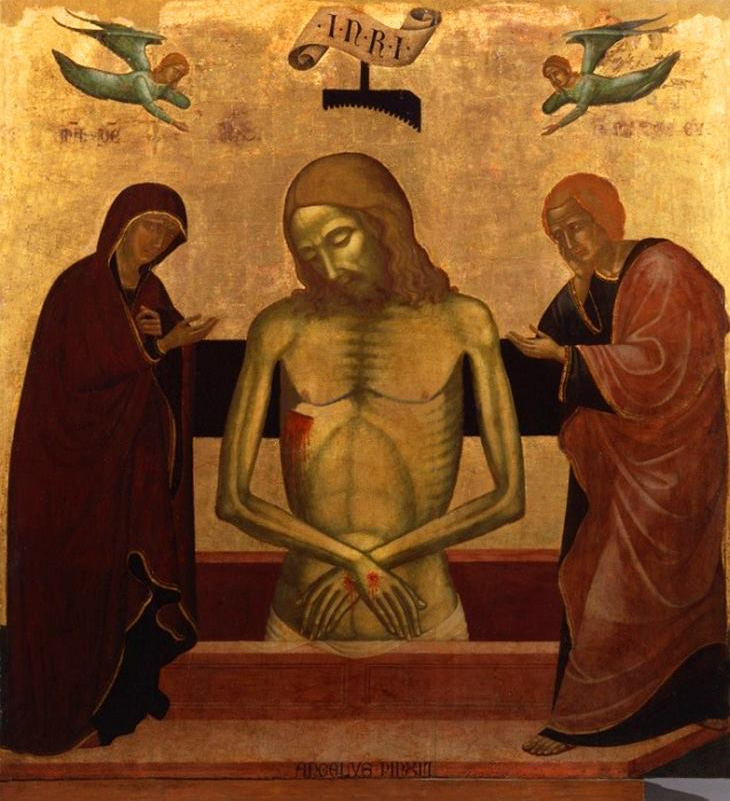
Jesus, Mary and Saint John (Akra Takinosi) (Museo Correr, Venice)

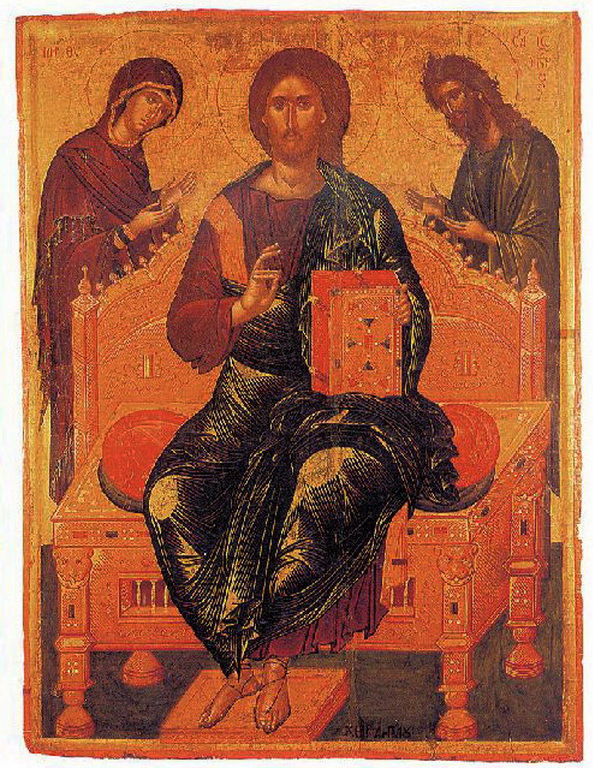
Christ Enthroned

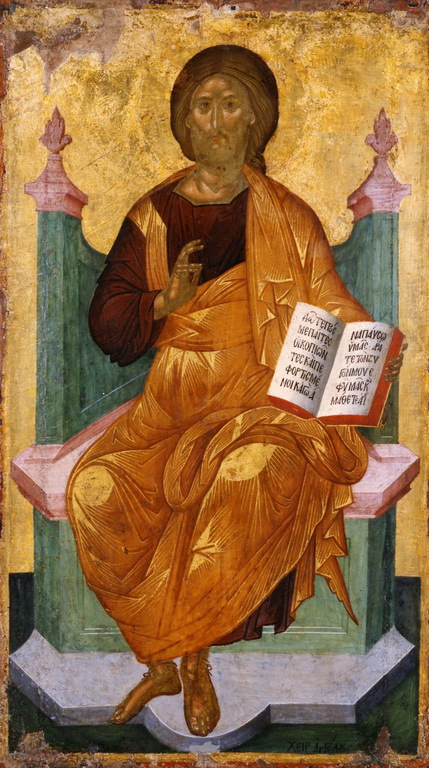
Christ Enthroned

== Notable works ==
- The Virgin Eleousa
- Saint Anne with the Virgin
- Christ the Vine (Angelo)

== See also ==
- Hagiography
- Iconography
- Michael Damaskenos
- Nikolaos Lampoudis
