= Tabletop of Asymus Stedelin =

1533 painting by Martin Schaffner

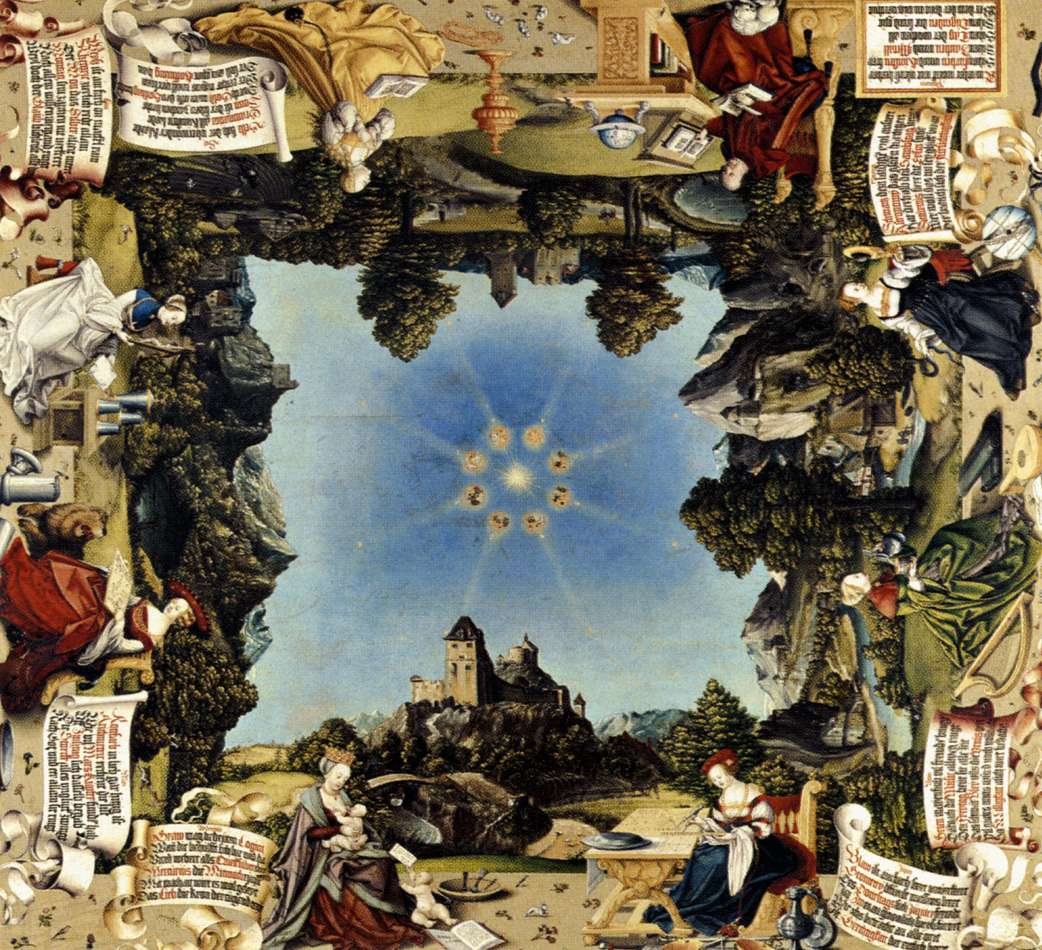
Tabletop of Asymus Stedelin

The Tabletop of Asymus Stedelin or Tabletop of Martin Schaffner is a 1533 painting on a tabletop, produced by the Ulm-based painter Martin Schaffner for Asymus Stedelin, a Strasbourg-based goldsmith. It is now in the Gemäldegalerie Alter Meister (Kassel).

== Sources ==
- "Tischplatte für Asymus Stedelin - Onlinedatenbank der Gemäldegalerie Alte Meister Kassel". altemeister.museum-kassel.de.
