= Church of St. Symeon, Mytilene =

Coordinates: 39.108425°N 26.556200°E

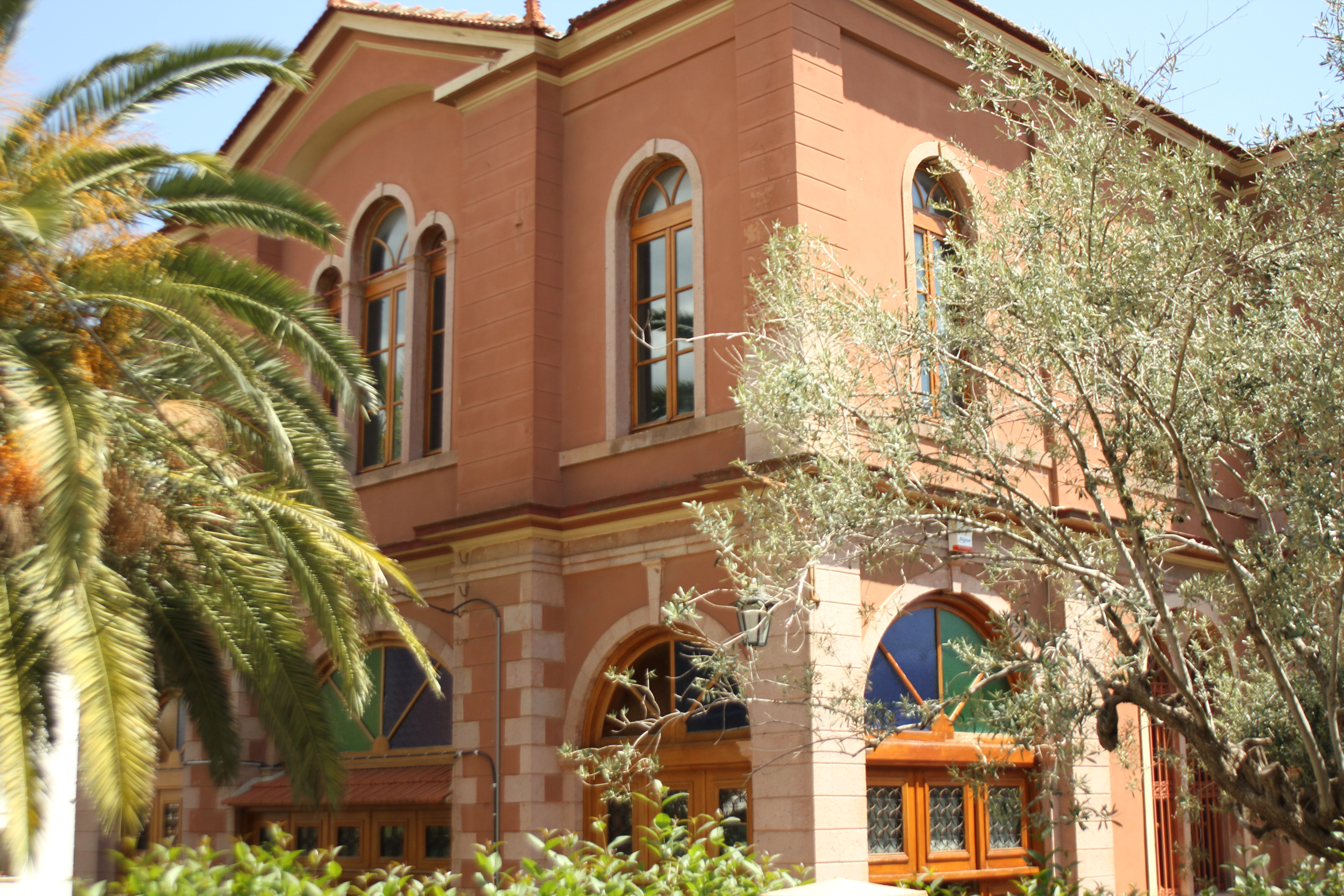
- Church of Saint Symeon Mytilene

The Church of Saint Symeon in Mytilene (Greek: Άγιος Συμεών Μυτιλήνης) is a church on the island of Lesvos in the city of Mytilene close to the old market. There was a necropolis in use in the sixth and seventh centuries near the location of the church. In the archive of the Metropolitan Church of Mytilene, documentation can be found regarding the church on pages 30a and 38B beginning in 1700. The specific church is mentioned, and it may have been built around 1700. A church was built on the site around 1885-1891, replacing the old church, which was smaller and ready to be torn down. This may be attributed to an earthquake in 1867. There exist architectural plans that show a huge church was on the site that predates the building of 1885. Three saints are venerated by the church; Saint Simeon Stylites of Syria, Saint Symeon Stylites of Lesbos and Simeon (Gospel of Luke).

== Architecture ==
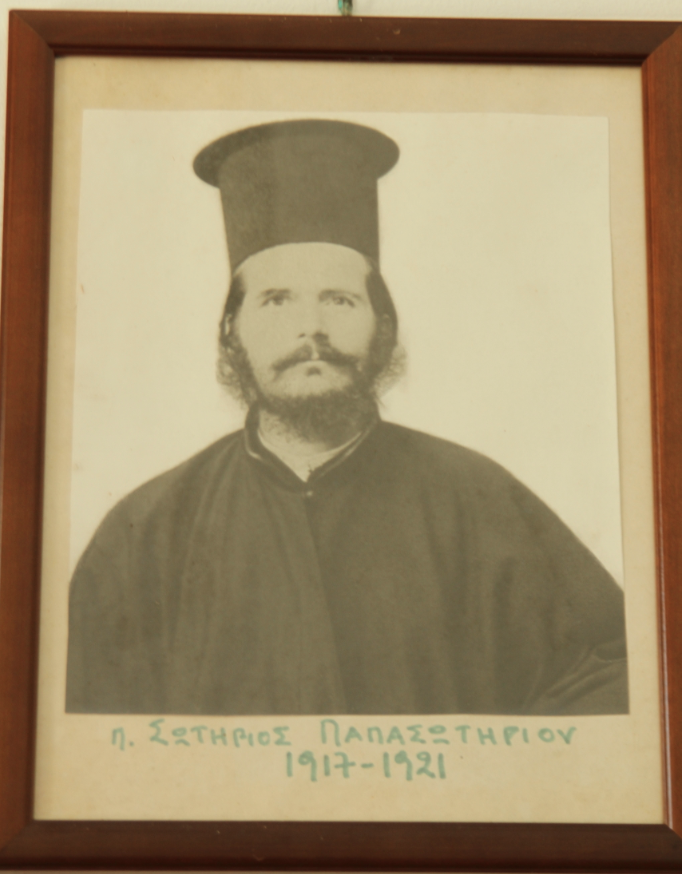
Papasotiriou.

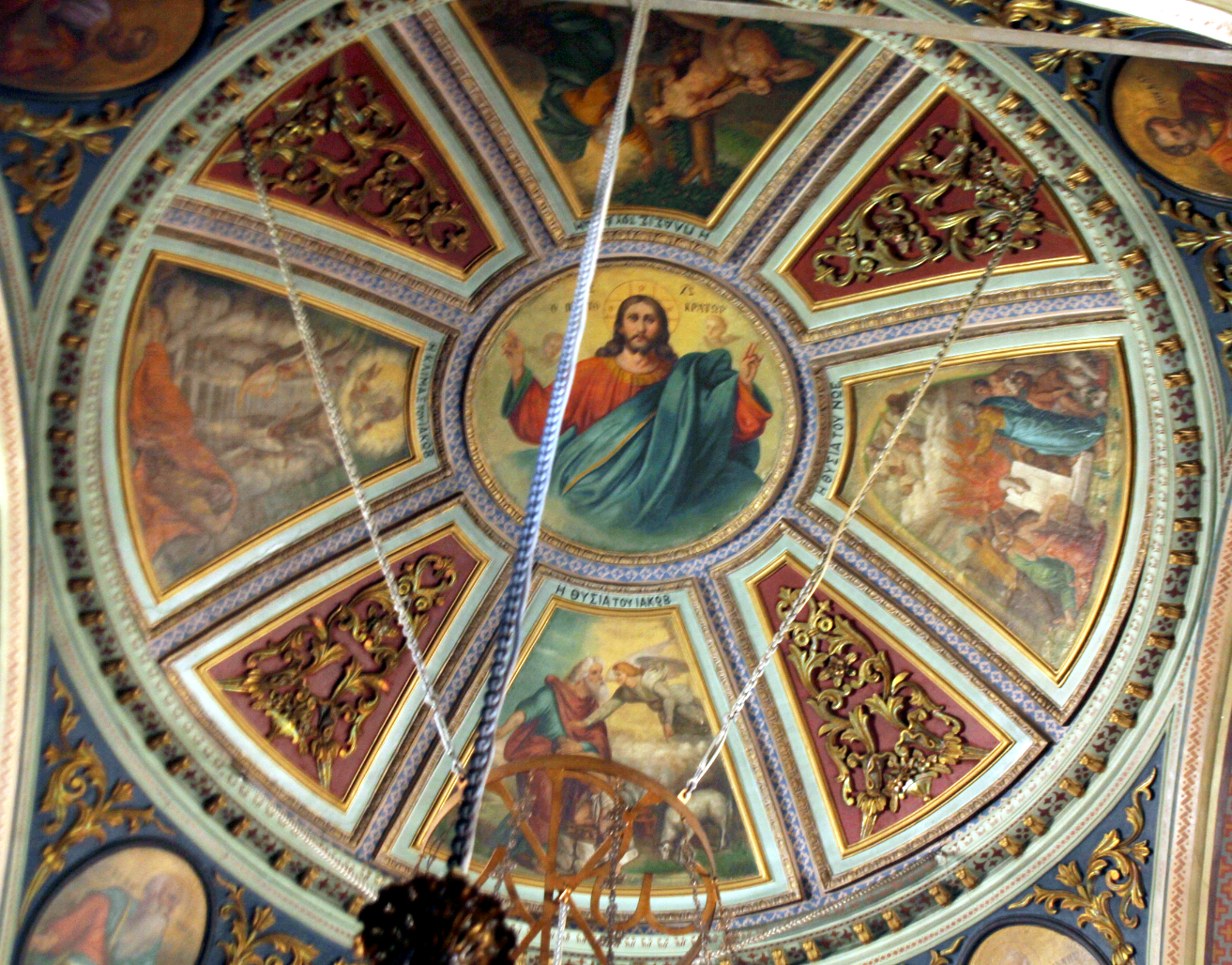
Circular dome with Jesus

The church has a circular dome with an icon venerating Jesus Christ. The outer portion consists of a biblical historical timeline with Hebrew stories from the Old Testament. The church is a Basilica with a cross-like structure. It was built with pendentives resembling the churches of the Middle Byzantine architecture. The cupola rests on pendentive-like arches. Pendentives can be seen in churches such as Hagia Sophia. The Church Bell Tower may have been funded by a priest named Sotirous Lekatsas Papasotiriou. He served as a priest at the church from 1917–1921.

The nave vaults of the church resemble Romanesque architecture used throughout Europe during the time of the Byzantine Empire on Gothic cathedrals. Examples include the interior of Speyer Cathedral, Speyer, Germany, around 1030. The columns also resemble the Byzantine style of architecture. The use of columns of this nature could be seen in the interior of Santa Costanza, Rome, Italy, ca. 337–351.

The entire church resembles an artistic work of art. The stone used to construct the church was brought from Sarmusak, a quarry in Turkey, located near the entrance to the bay of Ayvalik. The interior church design is stamped with crosses and iconographic areas, which were created by the local artist P Polichroni of the previous century.

The church has all the documentation that verifies the building from its inception. The church is located in a small neighborhood with a huge backyard. People from all over the island come and worship. Around Easter week, the church is bulging with people.

== Artifacts ==
The Iconostasis (altar screen), the holy altar, the ciborium, the pontifical throne, the pulpit, mobile shrines adoring the left and the right of the church entrance and the canopy epitaph are now in the Byzantine museum of the church for safe keeping, these artifacts belonged to the original church from the 1700s.

The woodcraft reassembled in the church is evidence of the early construction. It is demonstrated in church archives. The wood has elaborate carvings and religious motifs. The Iconostasis (altar screen) and the holy altar are both wood-carved and may be over 300 years old. Details describing the Wood sculptures were made by the late Metropolitan Iakovos Kleomvrotou in his film Mytilene Sacra.

In the current church, there is an icon of Saint Simeon Stylites. In 1975, it was sent for cleaning to the official Byzantine Ancient Artifacts Division, under the existing painting was found another painting of Byzantine Art. An experienced researcher established that the painting originated during the time of Palaiologos. The original painting that is at the church today is art of the 17th century, it belonged to the previous church.

== Picture Gallery ==
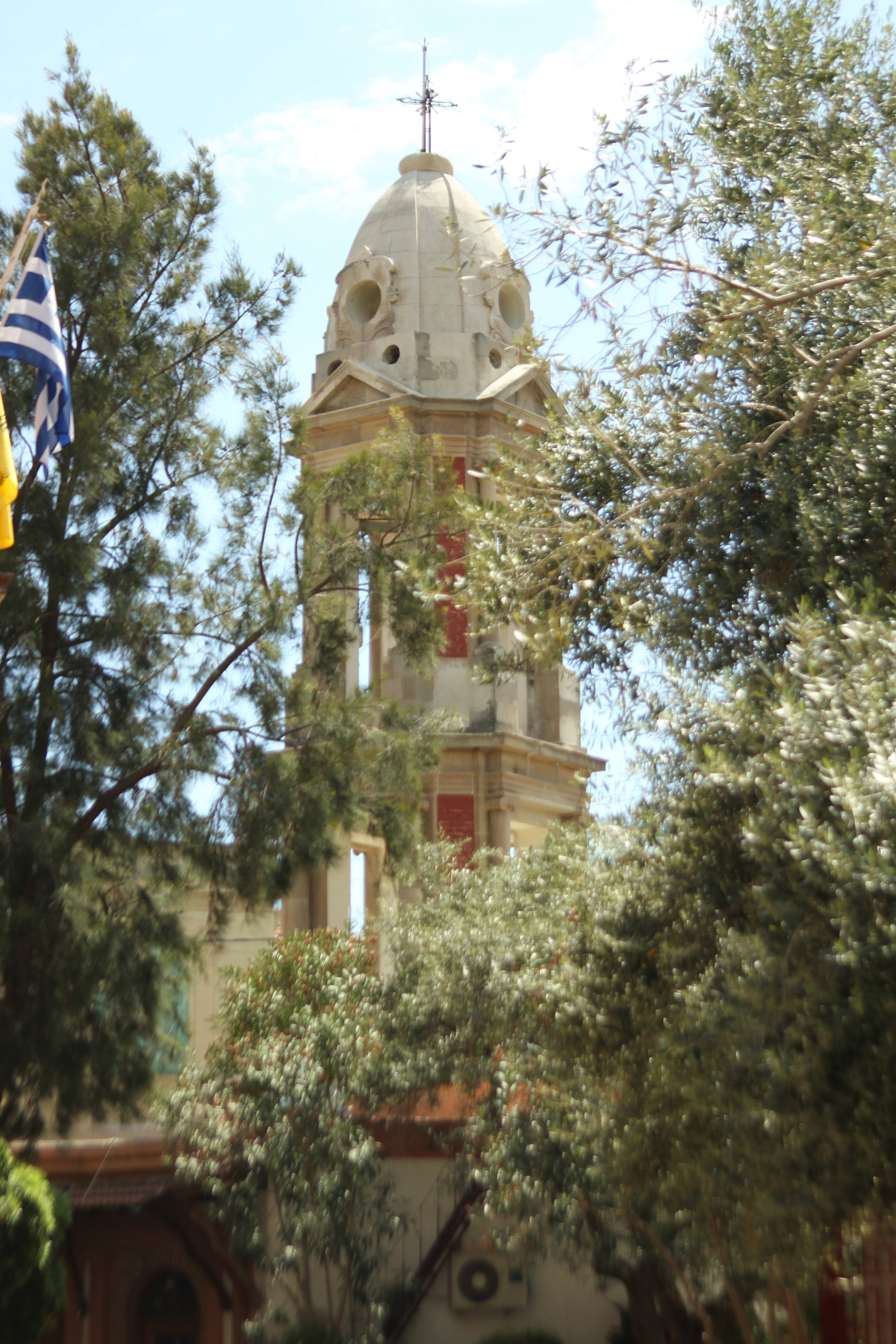
Bell Tower

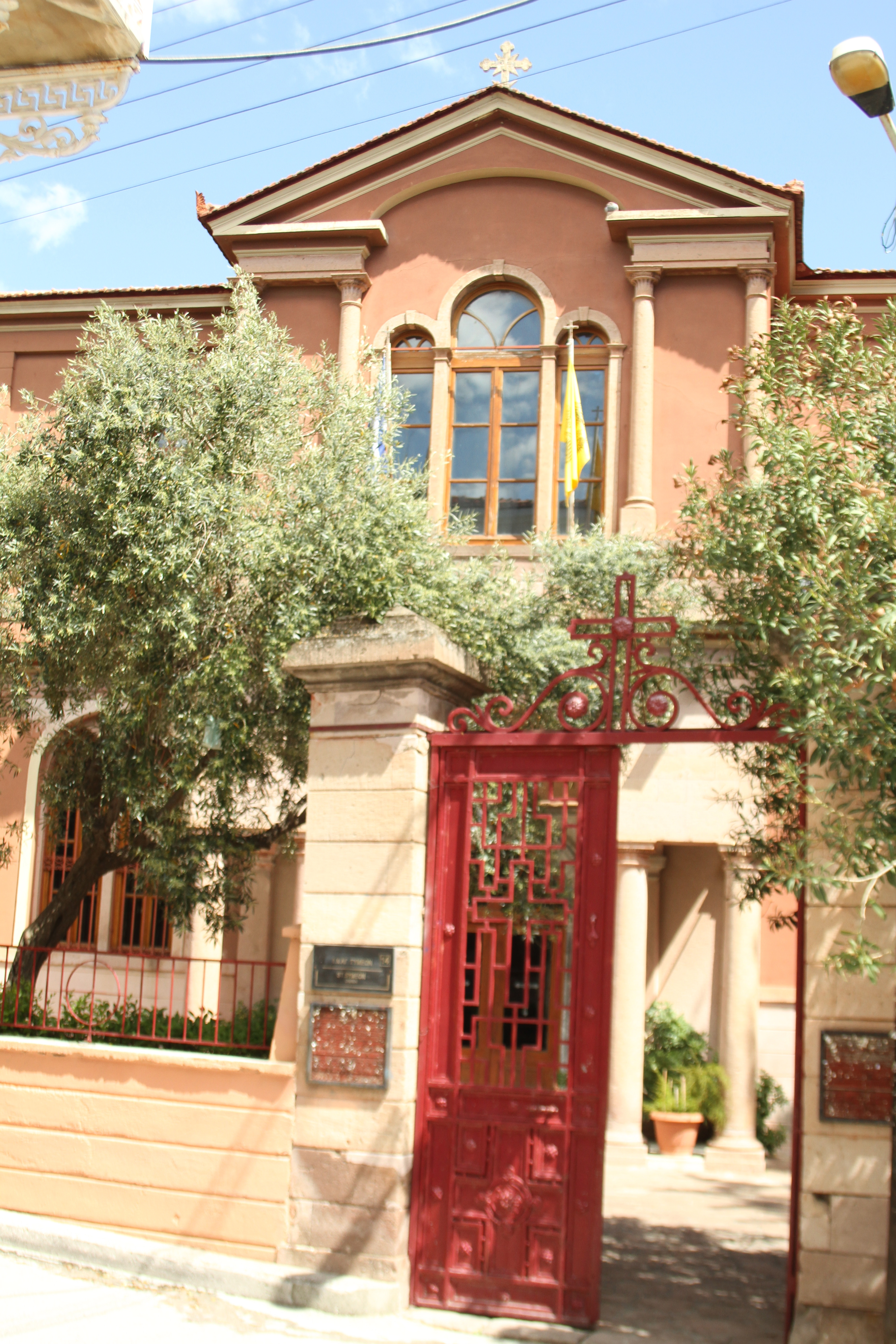
Entrance of Church

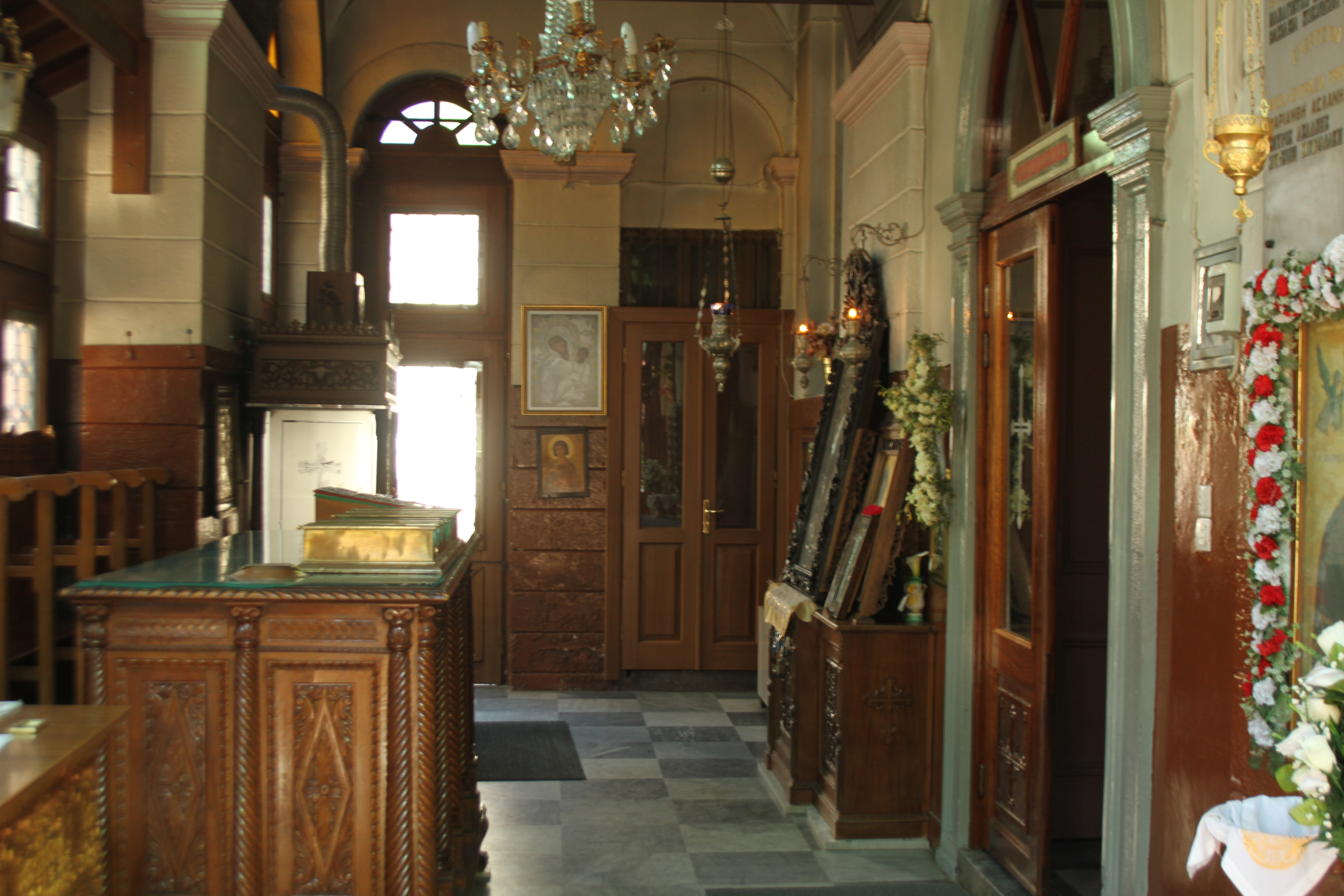
Interior

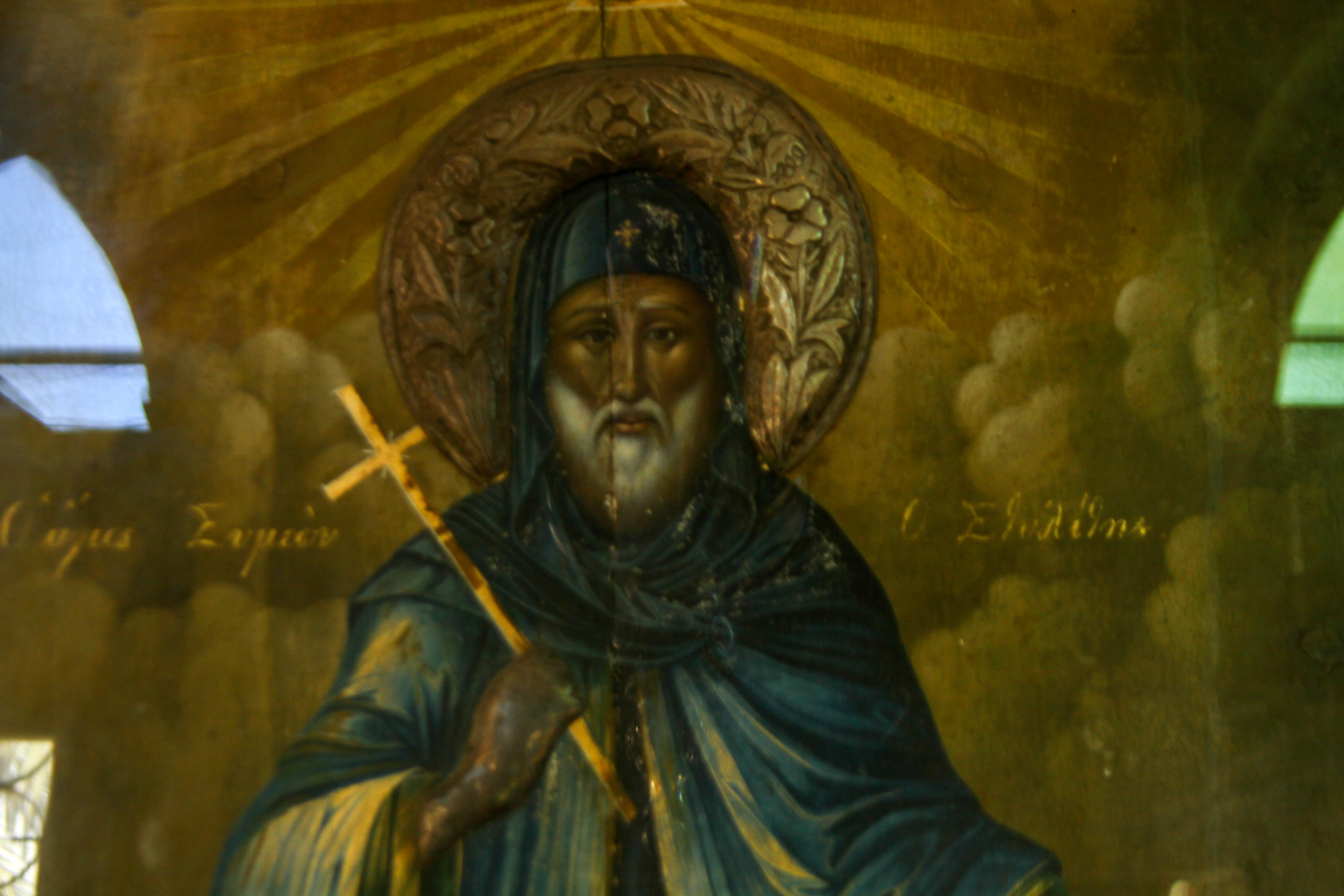
Simeon Stylites

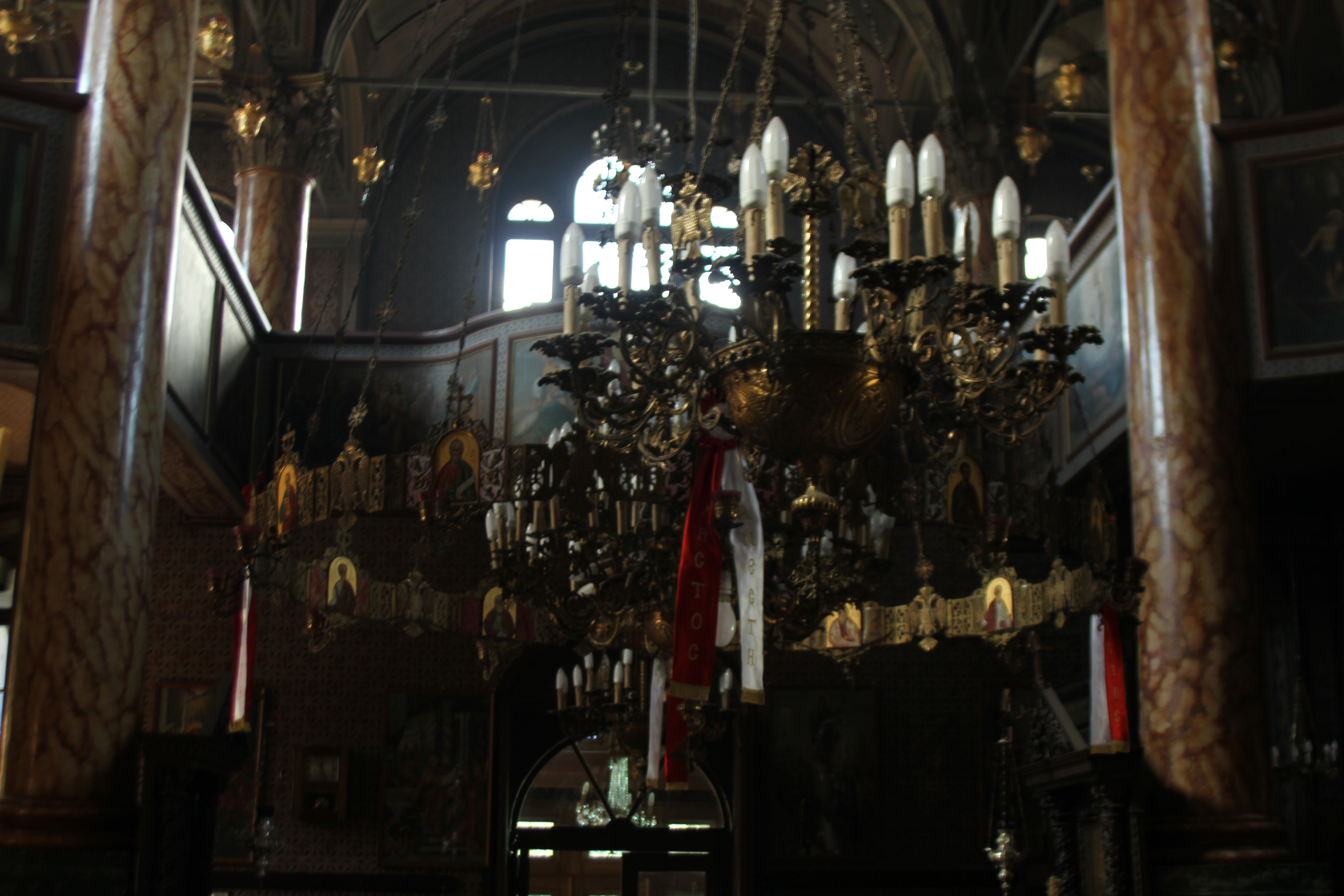
Exterior of Saint Symeon Mytilene

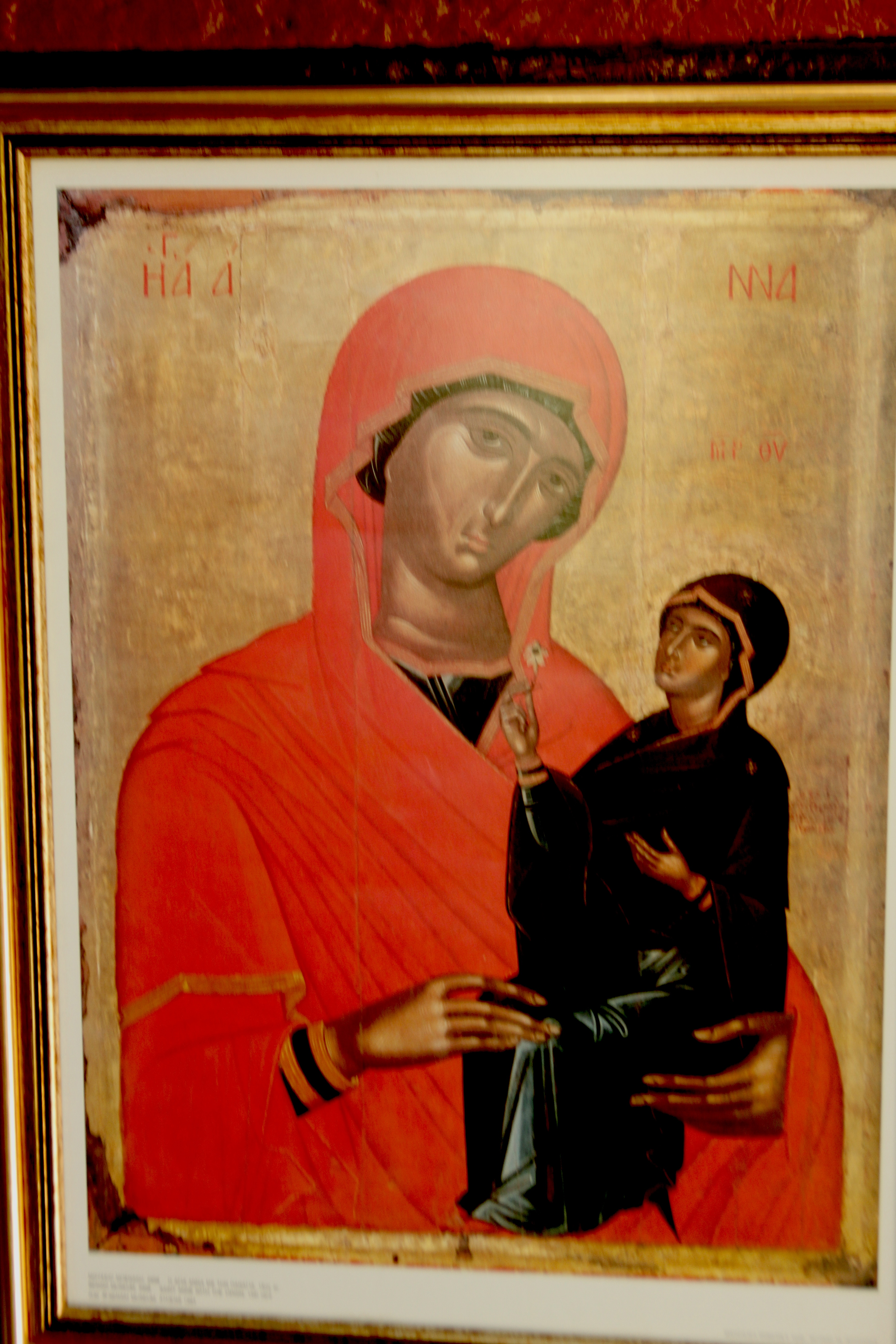
Panagia of Symeon Mytilene

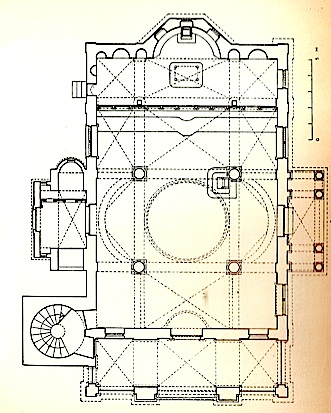
Floor Plan of the Church

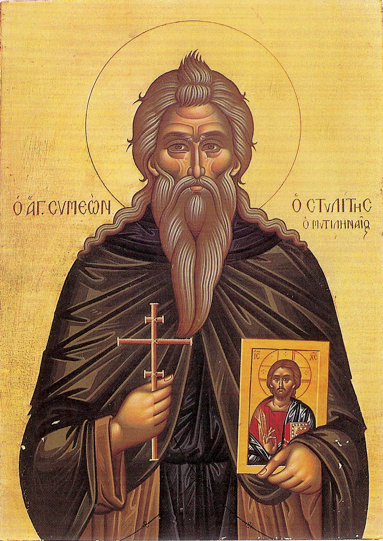
Saint Symeon Stylites of Lesbos

== Bibliography ==
- Doumouzi, Gregory A. (1991). Ο Ιερός Ναός του Άγιος Συμεών Μυτιλήνης [The Church of Saint Symeon of Mytilene]. Mytilini, Lesvos: Orthodox Church of Greece.
- Doumouzi, Gregory (2011). Παλαιοχριστιανικά βυζαντινά Μνημεία και Προσκυνήματα της Λέσβου [Early Christian Byzantine Monuments and Pilgrimage Sites of Lesvos]. Mytilini, Lesvos: Lesvos Hoteliers Association.
- Doumouzi, Gregory (2004). Κληρικούς της Ιεράς Μητροπόλεως Μυτιλήνης [Clergy of the Holy Metropolis of Mytilene]. Mytilini, Lesvos: Church of Greece.
- Kleiner, Fred S. (2009). Gardner's Art through the Ages: A Concise Global History, Second Edition. Boston, MA: Wadsworth Cengage Learning. ISBN 978-0495503460.
- Shields, Emily Ledyard (1917). The Cults of Lesbos. Menasha, Wisconsin: George Banta Publishing Company.
- Papastratou, Dore (1990). Paper Icons Greek Orthodox Religious Engravings, 1665-1899 Volume 2. Athens, Greece: Papastratos Publishing.
- Christesen, Paul; Cartledge, Paul, eds. (2024). The Oxford History of the Archaic Greek World Volume I: Argos to Corcyra. Oxford, England: Oxford University Press. ISBN 9780199383610.
