= Antonios Papadopoulos (painter) =

Greek painter from Crete (1439–1481)

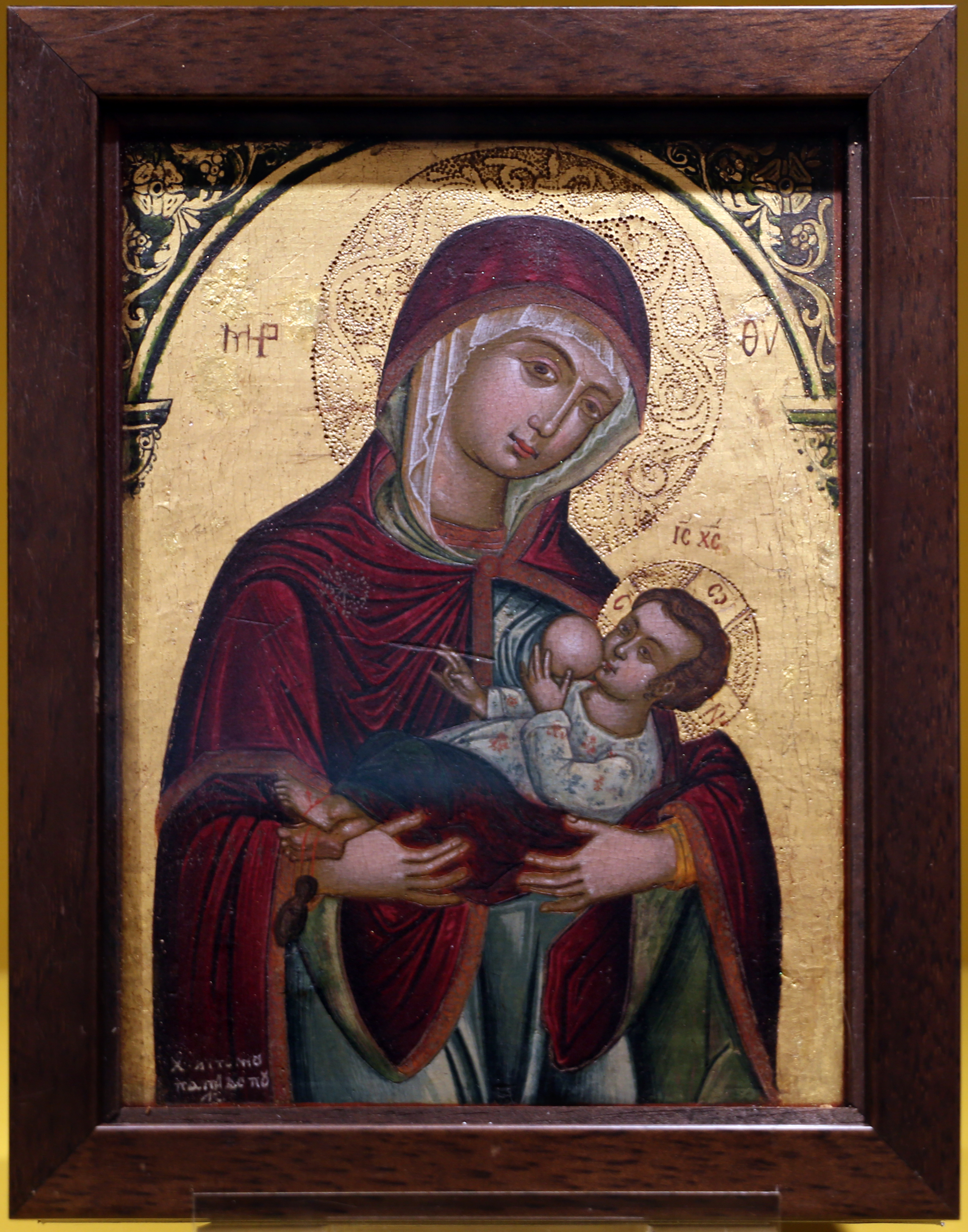
- Nursing Madonna
- Born: 1439; Chania, Crete
- Died: 1481 (aged 41–42); Heraklion, Crete
- Education: Apprentice to Angelos Akotantos
- Known for: Iconography and hagiography
- Movement: Cretan school

Antonios Papadopoulos (Greek: Αντώνιος Παπαδόπουλος, 1439 – 1481; also known as Antonio Papadopoulo.) was a Greek painter who represented the Cretan Renaissance. Papadopoulos, Andreas Pavias, Andreas Ritzos, and Nikolaos Tzafouris were all students of famous painter Angelos Akotantos. Papadopoulos reflects the sophistication and evolution of Byzantine painting to a more refined Venetian style. Although Cretan painting continued the tradition of the maniera greca, every icon reflected its own sophistication and uniqueness. Papadopoulos and his contemporaries influenced countless artists, namely Emmanuel Lambardos, Emmanuel Tzanfournaris, Thomas Bathas, and Markos Bathas. His most notable artwork is the Nursing Madonna or Galaktotrophousa. El Greco painted similar subject matter.

== History ==
Papadopoulos was born in Chania. His father's name was Vasseleos. Vasseleos was a priest. When he was 14 his father signed a contract with famous painter Angelos Aktantos. Angelos taught him icon painting for five years. In 1481, he traveled to Naxos to paint. His assistant was Ioanni Kouri. Papadopoulos's painting style reflects Angelos Akotantos's mannerism. Angelos Akotantos influenced Greek and Italian art for over five hundred years. Papadopoulos's Nursing Madonna is in the Vatican Collection. The Madonna exhibits a childlike innocence in the Nursing Madonna. Other painters who painted the Nursing Madonna following the maniera greca include Barnaba da Modena, the Master of the Magdalen and Lippo Memmi.

== See also ==
- El Greco Nursing Madonna

== Bibliography ==
- Hatzidakis, Manolis (1987). Greek painters after the fall (1450–1830) Volume A. Athens, GR: Center for Modern Greek Studies E.I.E.
- Hatzidakis, Manolis & Drakopoulou, Eugenia (1997). Greek painters after the fall (1450–1830) Volume B. Athens, GR: Center for Modern Greek Studies E.I.E.
- Drakopoulou, Eugenia (2010). Greek painters after the fall (1450–1830) Volume C. Athens, GR: Center for Modern Greek Studies E.I.E.
