= Jörg Stocker =

German painter

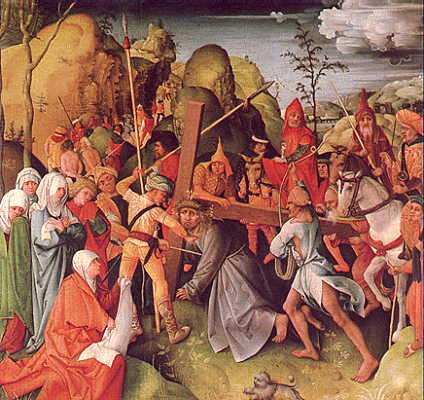
Christ Bearing the Cross.

Jörg Stocker (ca. 1481-ca. 1527) was a German painter.
