= Michael Fokas =

Greek painter (1473–1504)

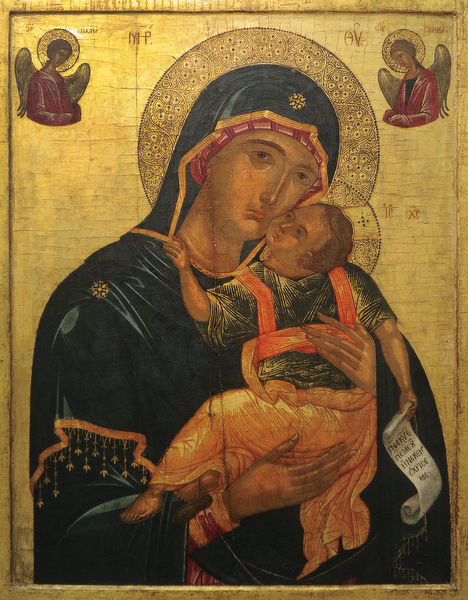
- Blue Madonna, similar to the icons produced in quantity by the Fokas workshop
- Born: 1473; Heraklion, Crete, Greece
- Died: 1504 (aged 30–31); Heraklion, Crete, Greece
- Known for: Painting
- Movement: Cretan school
- Spouses: Maria Yiatana; Francheskina
- Patrons: Giorgio Basejo and Petro Varsama
- Occupation: Painter
- Years active: 1478–1504
- Era: Greek Renaissance
- Style: Maniera Greca

Michael Fokas (Greek: Μιχαήλ Φωκάς; 1473–1504), also known as Migiel Fuca, was a Greek icon painter and art instructor. He came from a prominent family of painters, the founders of the Cretan school; working in this style, Fokas's workshop mass-produced icons for Greek and Italian clients. No surviving painting bears Fokas's signature, but history has preserved a commission for 200 icons which he received on July 4, 1499. This important document charges Fokas to produce works based upon the prototype Madre della Consolazione, originally created by Nikolaos Tzafouris and modeled after Giovanni Bellini.

Fokas's coworkers were Antonios Tajiaperas, Nikolaos Gripiotis, and Georgios Mitsoconstantinos. His granduncle was Manuel Fokas, also a prominent icon painter. The family was directly affiliated with another famous exponent of the Cretan school, Andreas Pavias.

== History ==
Michael Fokas was born on the island of Crete, in the city of Heraklion. His family had worked successfully as painters since the Palaeologan Renaissance, and the name Fokas had consequently become a standard in the visual arts. Michael's father Georgios, grand uncle Manuel, and grandfather Michael were all painters, the latter being famous for his work in fresco. Michael may also have been related to Georgios Kalliergis, an earlier painter based in Thessaloniki. This artist's family had originated in Crete, and changed its surname from Phokas to Kallergis during the Venetian dominion over the island.

Aided by the prominence of his family name, Fokas maintained a very successful painting workshop in Crete. Surviving documents describe a flourishing interval for this workshop during the summer of 1499. On May 18, Fokas hired the Greek painter Antonios Tajiaperas to collaborate in fulfilling a massive commission for icons. Tajiaperas was to paint the face of the Virgin Mary, leaving the rest of the picture to other artists. His contract required him to paint seven such faces per day for two months; in exchange, Fokas would provide him with food, housing, and a salary. One month later, in early June, Fokas hired the master woodcarver Giorgio Sclavo to cut one thousand wood panels, in three different sizes, on which further icons would be painted.

On July 4, 1499, Fokas helped fulfill one of the biggest orders for icons in recorded Cretan history. Two merchants, Giorgio Basejo from Venice and Petro Varsama from Morea, commissioned 700 icons in two different styles, Greek and Italian. They divided the order between the workshops of Fokas and two other painters, Nikolaos Gripiotis and Georgios Mitsoconstantinos. Fokas was to paint 200 icons in forma a la Latina, partaking of stylistic traditions developed in Italy. The contract calls for 100 of the works to match the style of Nikolaos Gripiotis. 50 icons would depict the Virgin Mary attired in deep blue with gold brocade, and 50 would make her costume purple with gold brocade. Gripiotis himself was to complete 300 works forma a la Latina. Mitsoconstantinos was to complete 100 forma a la Latina and 100 forma a la greca, the latter partaking of stylistic traditions developed in the Byzantine world. The artists were given forty-two days to fulfill the order.

As with his two collaborators, Fokas has left behind no signed works. There is a large corpus of extant icons from the Cretan school, but, in the absence of artists' signatures, none can be traced back to the massive 1499 commission. Following the norms of the time, Fokas's signature would have been χειρ Φωκά or Migiel Fuca Pinxit.

Fokas was married twice. His first wife was named Maria Yiatana, and his second Francheskina. On February 15, 1500, he was hired to take an artistic pupil named Giannis Koronaios. Fokas died four years later. His widow Francheskina sold two mansions and four small houses on August 28, 1504.

== Gallery ==
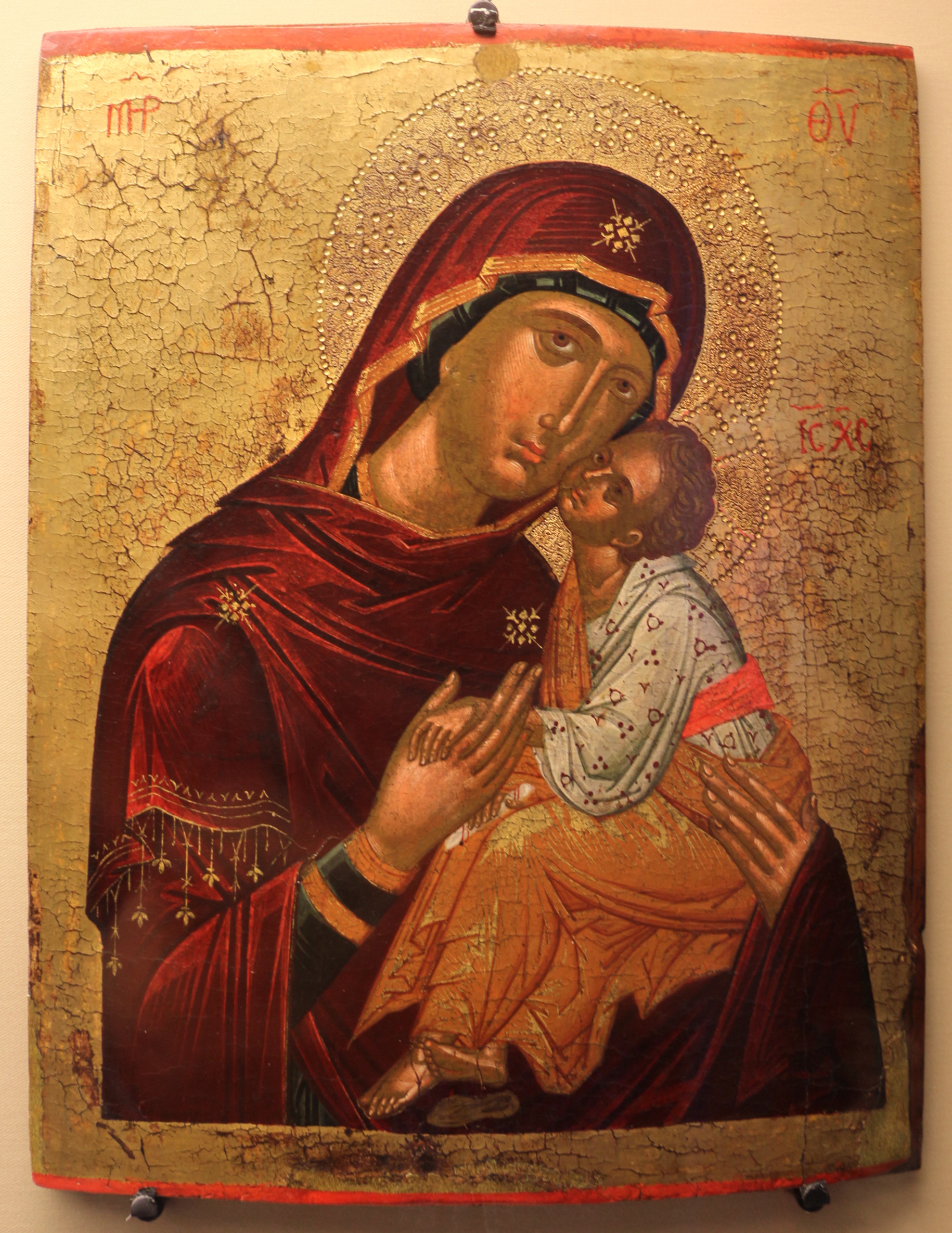
Greek Style Cretan Prototype

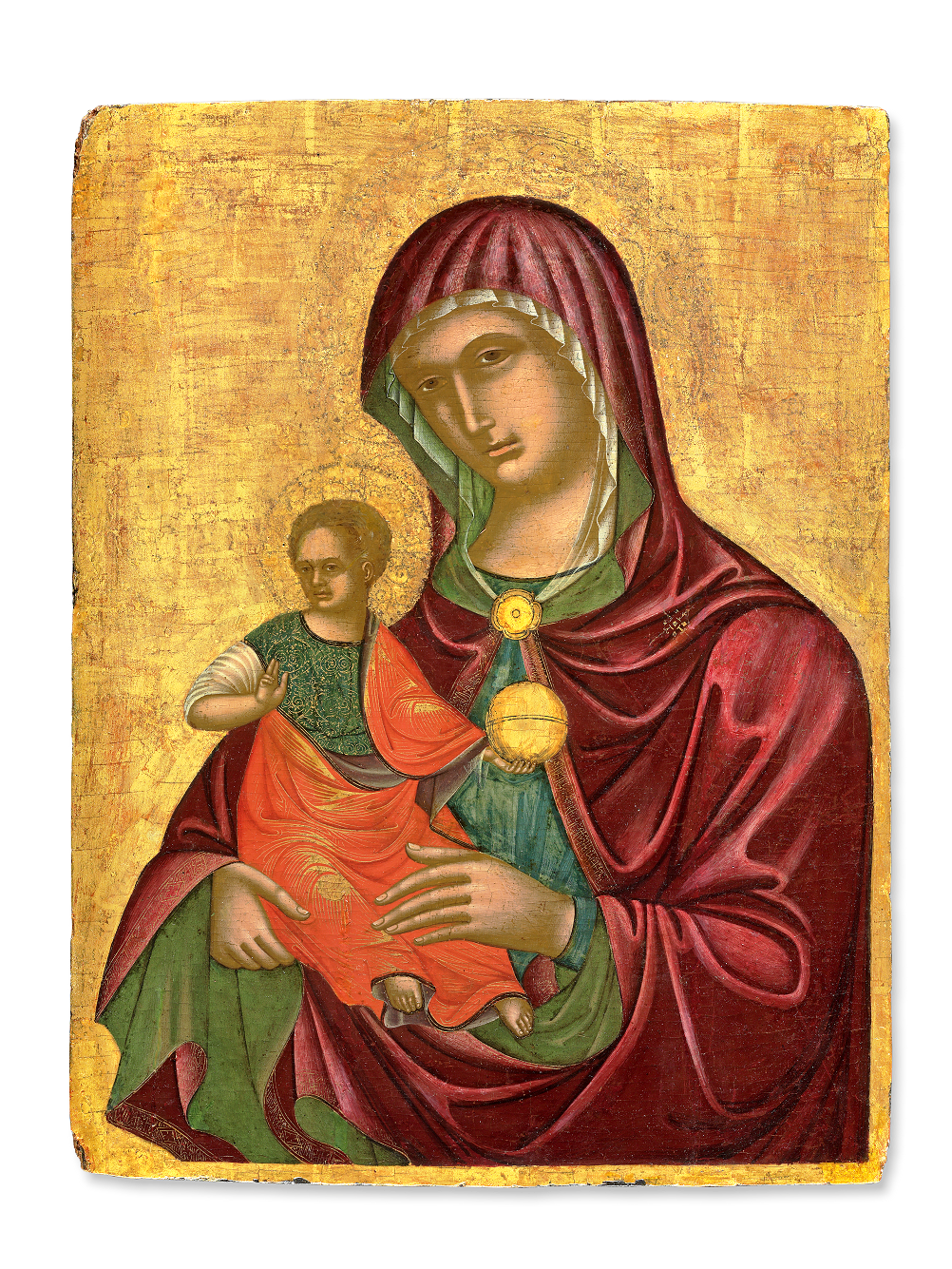
Italian Style Cretan Prototype

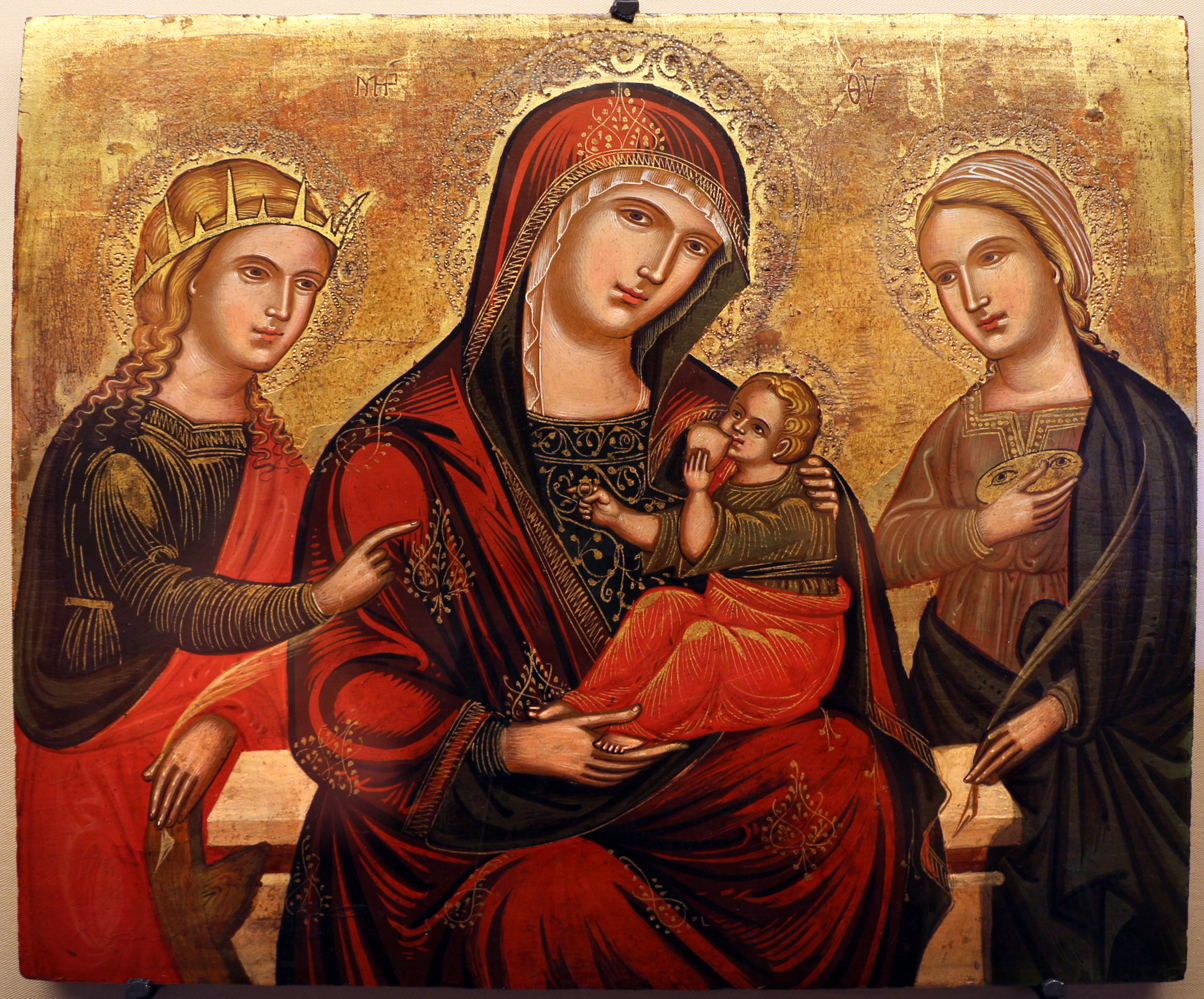
Italian Style Cretan Prototype

== Bibliography ==
- Hatzidakis, Manolis (1987). Έλληνες Ζωγράφοι μετά την Άλωση (1450-1830). Τόμος 1: Αβέρκιος - Ιωσήφ [Greek Painters after the Fall of Constantinople (1450-1830). Volume 1: Averkios - Iosif]. Athens: Center for Modern Greek Studies, National Research Foundation. hdl:10442/14844. ISBN 960-7916-01-8.
- Voulgaropoulou, Margarita (2020). "From Domestic Devotion to the Church Altar: Venerating Icons in the Late Medieval and Early Modern Adriatic". Religions. 10 (6): 390. doi:10.3390/rel10060390.
- Hatzidakis, Manolis; Drakopoulou, Evgenia (1997). Έλληνες Ζωγράφοι μετά την Άλωση (1450-1830). Τόμος 2: Καβαλλάρος - Ψαθόπουλος [Greek Painters after the Fall of Constantinople (1450-1830). Volume 2: Kavallaros - Psathopoulos]. Athens: Center for Modern Greek Studies, National Research Foundation. hdl:10442/14088. ISBN 960-7916-00-X.
