= Madre della Consolazione =

Painting by Nikolaos Tzafouris

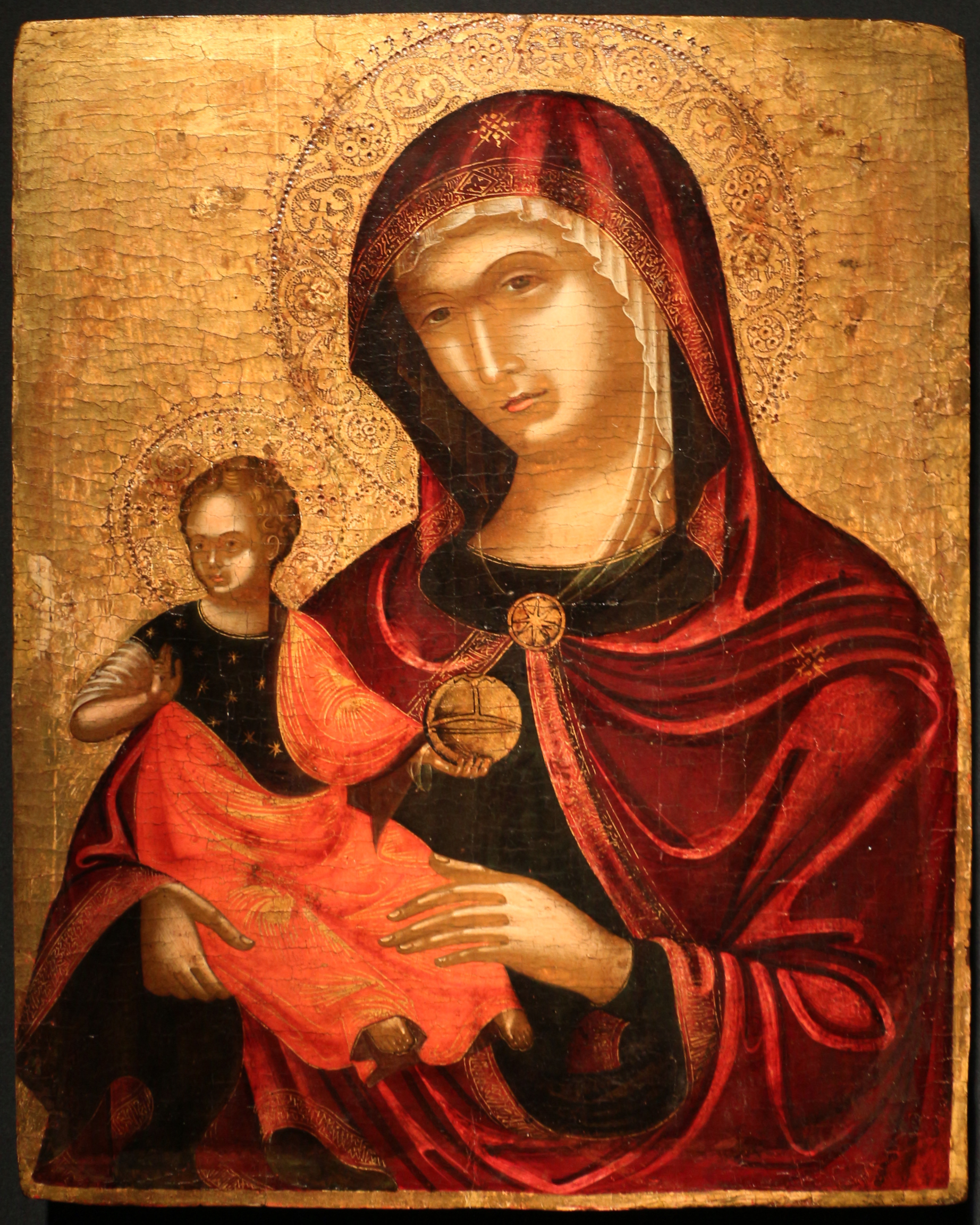
- Artist: Nikolaos Tzafouris
- Year: c. 1490
- Medium: Panel, gesso, tempera
- Movement: Cretan School
- Dimensions: 44 cm × 35.5 cm (17 in × 14.0 in)
- Location: Netherlands
- Owner: Private Collection

Madre della Consolazione is a tempera painting created by Greek painter Nikolaos Tzafouris. Tzafouris was active during the second half of the 15th century. He was a prominent member of the Cretan School. He was influenced by Angelos Akotantos. The painter was exposed to works of Giovanni Bellini. At some point, he traveled to Venice and studied painting in the city. He is considered one of the most important painters because he introduced two prototypes that were mass produced by Cretan workshops. The painter is attributed with starting the specific style on the island of Crete. Most historians refer to the style as the Italian style Madonna in comparison to its Greek counterparts. Madre della Consolazione is very important because it served as a prototype for workshops on the island and it was heavily copied. Famous Greek painter Nikolaos Gripiotis and his contemporaries mass-produced the prototype. It is very difficult to attribute unsigned works because the prototype was mass-produced.

== Description ==
The painting is an excellent example of the migration from the traditional Greek Byzantine style to the Italian Renaissance style. The work was heavily influenced by Bellini's Madonna and Child. The prototype is made of tempera and gold leaf. It was completed towards the end of the 15th century. The height of the work is 44 cm (17 in.) the width of the work is 35.5 cm (14 in.). The painter features heavy folds of fabric. He mastered a unique shadowing technique prevalent in the work. Mary's garment features curved lines. The Virgin has a fuller face. The Virgin's garment is held together by a decorative brooch clasp. The young Christ child is held gently by his majestic heavenly mother. He is sitting in the traditional hodegetria position. He holds a sphere representing the world instead of the traditional scroll. The Virgin and Christ child face Rome looking at the holy city from Constantinople. The infant is blessing the west. His shirt features decorative stars. The work of art was part of the collection of the Morsink Icon Gallery in Amsterdam until 2016. The work was purchased by a private collector from the Netherlands. Two of his notable works are in the Netherlands. The second one bears his signature. The signature was discovered in 1999.

== Attribution ==
It is very difficult to pinpoint the workshop that completed the masterpiece due to over production of the same image. Scholars denoted that the work featured similar floral punched motifs that are prevalent in the halos of a signed version in Tzafouris's Pietà painting. The work is in the Kunsthistorisches Museum in Vienna. The halos of the Madre della Consolazione painting often exhibited in the Ikonen-Museum Recklinghausen, Germany in a signed work created by Tzafouris also exhibit similar characteristics. The work is part of a private collection in the Netherlands. The characteristics all resemble Tzafouris's work or a painter from his immediate circle.

== Gallery ==
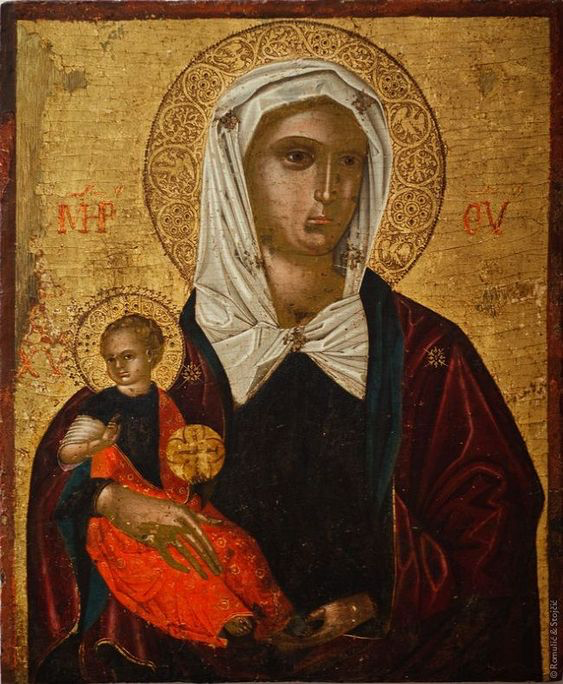
Madonna and Child after Bellini

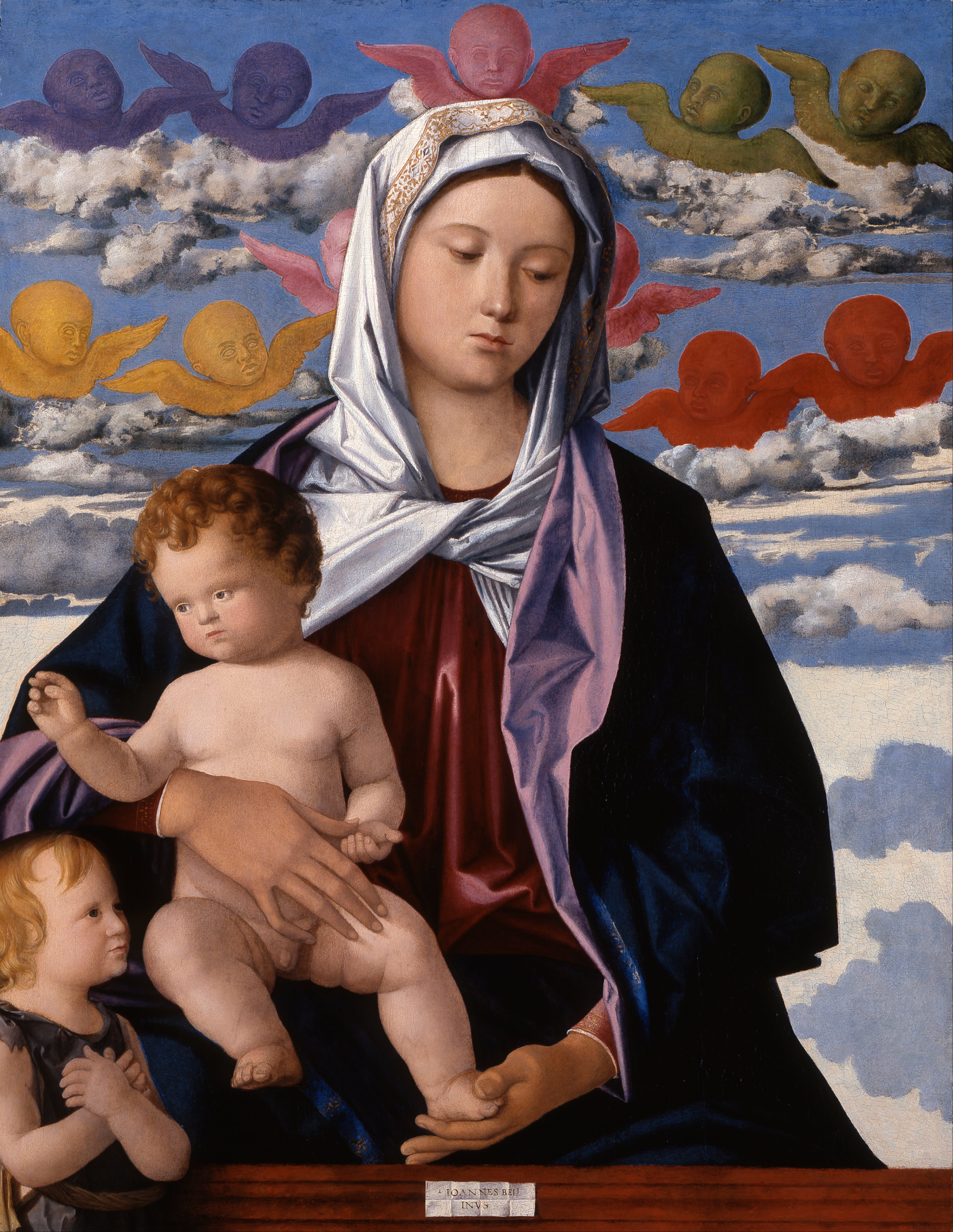
Madonna and Child with St. John the Baptist

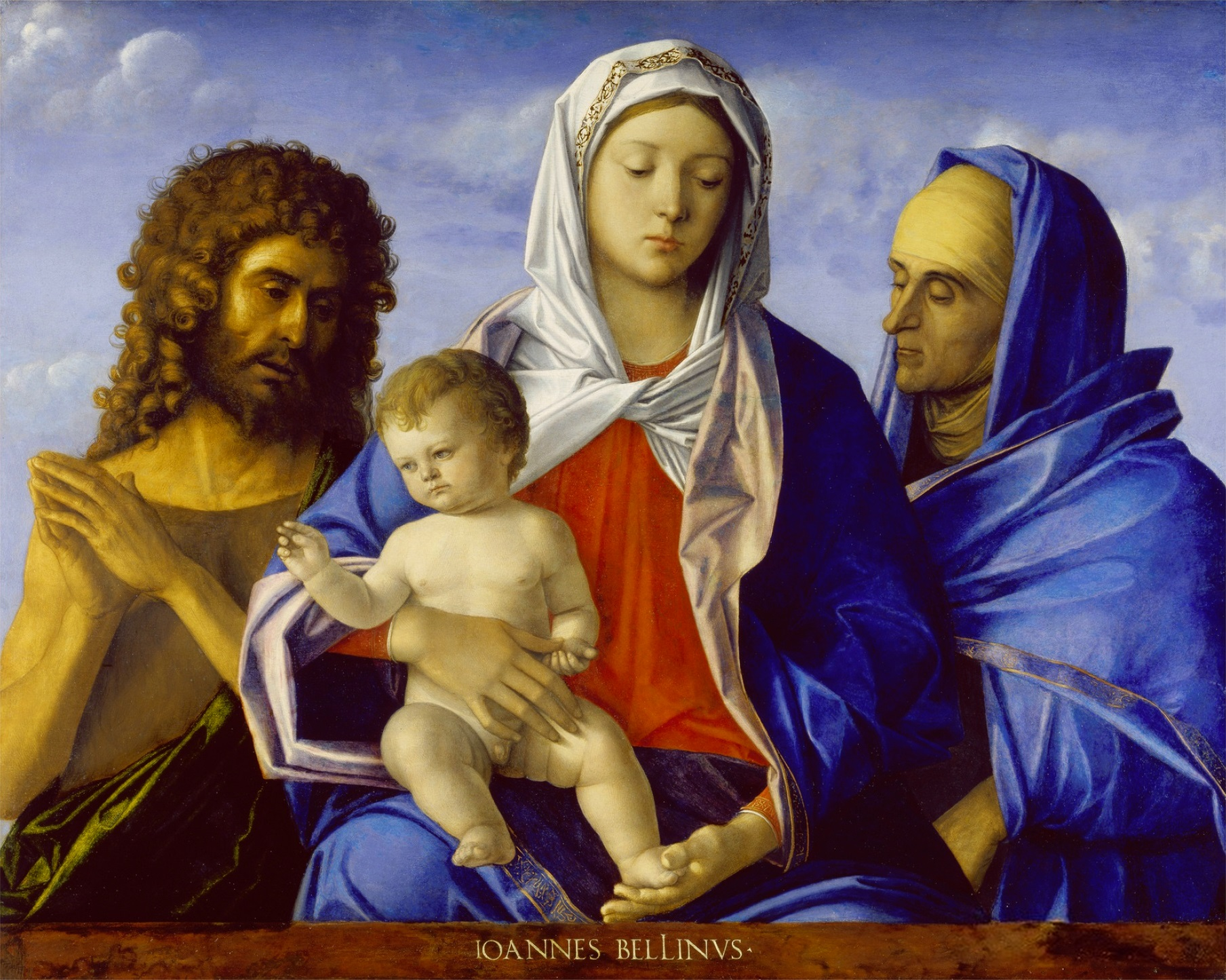
Madonna and Child with Saints John the Baptist and Elizabeth

== Similar works ==
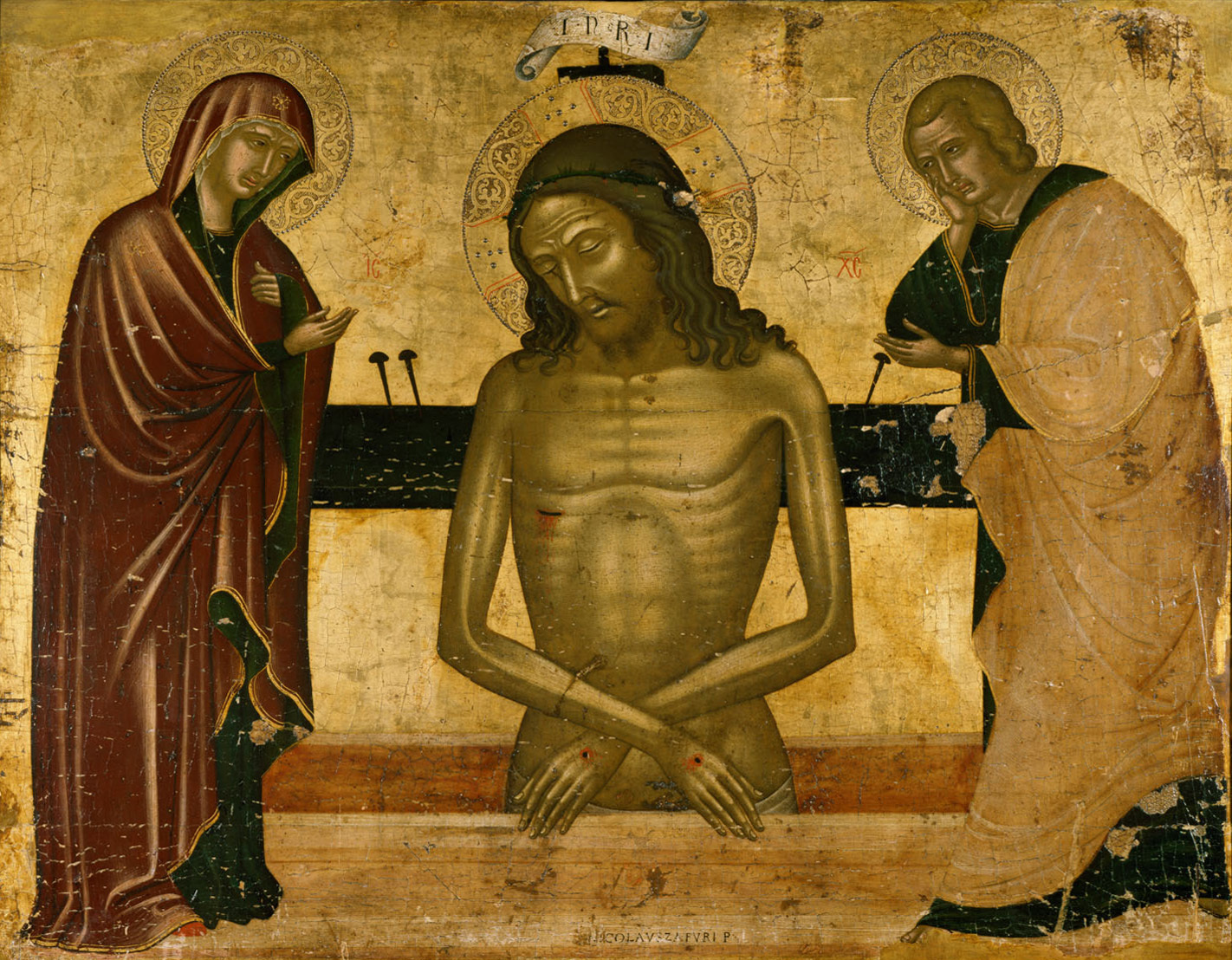
Kunsthistorisches Pieta floral punched motifs

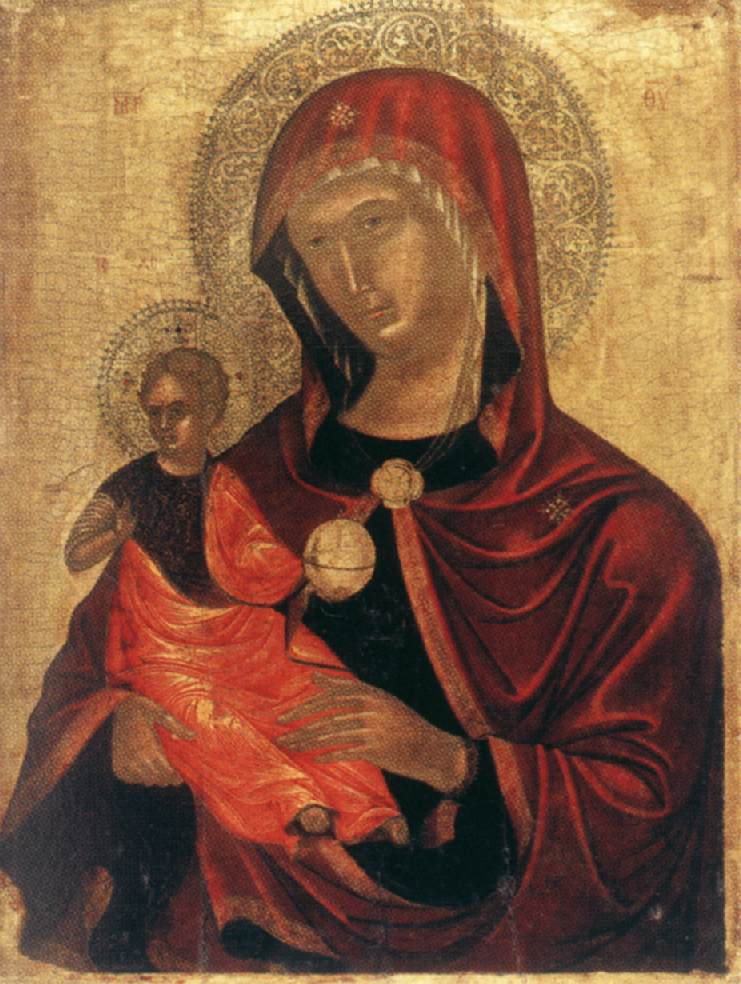
Signed Netherlands Version Madre della Consolazione

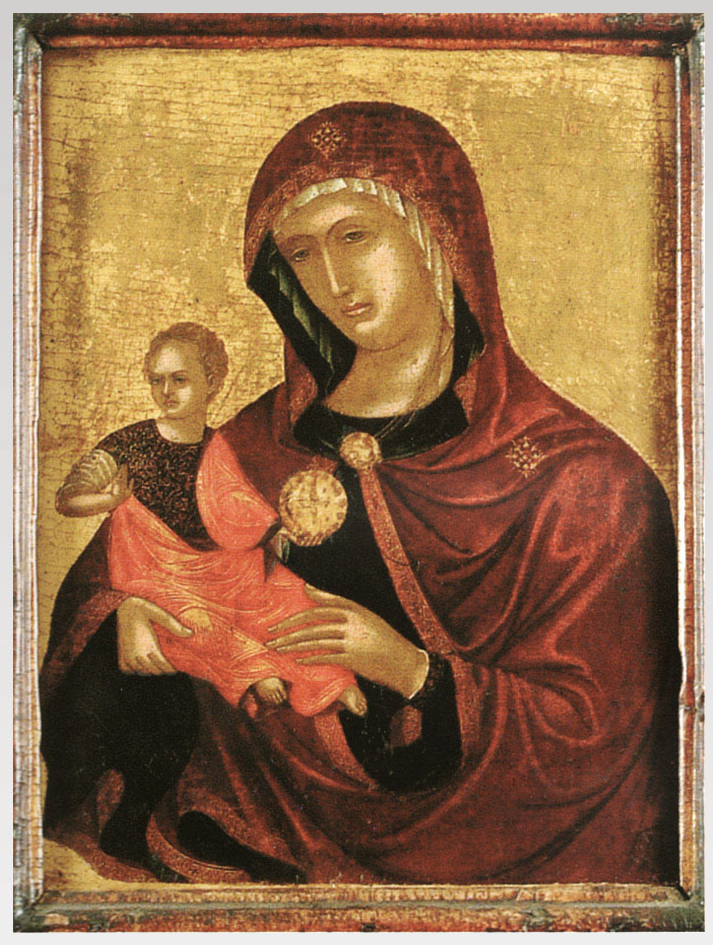
Kanellopoulos Madre della Consolazione

== See also ==
- Greek Madonna

== Bibliography ==
- Voulgaropoulou, Margarita (2020). "From Domestic Devotion to the Church Altar: Venerating Icons in the Late Medieval and Early Modern Adriatic". Religions. 10 (6): 390. doi:10.3390/rel10060390.
- Richardson, Carol M. (2007). Locating Renaissance Art. United Kingdom: Yale University Press. ISBN 9780300121889.
- Hatzidakis, Manolis (1987). Έλληνες Ζωγράφοι μετά την Άλωση (1450-1830). Τόμος 1: Αβέρκιος - Ιωσήφ [Greek Painters after the Fall of Constantinople (1450-1830). Volume 1: Averkios - Iosif]. Athens: Center for Modern Greek Studies, National Research Foundation. hdl:10442/14844. ISBN 960-7916-01-8.
- Mantas, Apostolos (2018). Ο Κρητικός Ζωγράφος Νικόλαος Τζαφούρης Ενυπόγραφα και Αποδιδόμενα Εργα [Catalog of Nikolaos Tzafouris Signed and Attributed Works with Detailed Analysis (Greek)] (PDF). Ioannina Greece: The University of Ioannina Philosophical School.
