= Christ Bearing the Cross =

Painting by Nikolaos Tzafouris

- Ο Χριστός Φέρων τον Σταυρό (Greek), Cristo Portacroce (Italian)
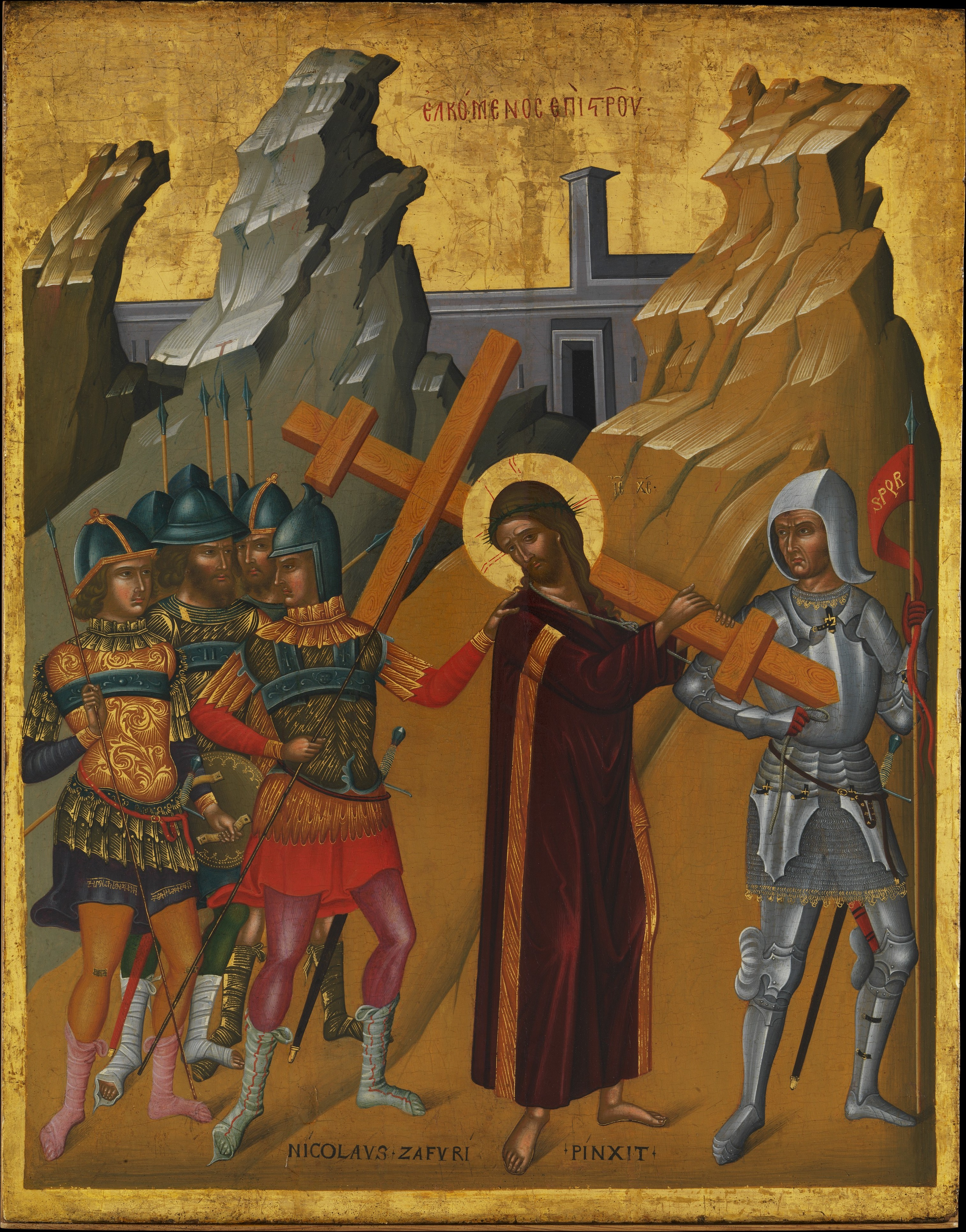
- Artist: Nikolaos Tzafouris
- Year: c. 1487–1501
- Medium: Tempera on wood
- Movement: Cretan School
- Subject: Christ bearing the Cross
- Dimensions: 69.2 cm × 54.6 cm (27.25 in × 21,5 in)
- Location: Metropolitan Museum of Art, New York
- Owner: Bashford Dean Memorial Collection
- Website: Christ Bearing the Cross

Christ Bearing the Cross is a painting in tempera attributed to the Greek painter Nikolaos Tzafouris. Tzafouris is considered one of the founding members of the Cretan School along with Andreas Ritzos, Andreas Pavias, and Angelos Akotantos. He was influenced by Angelos Akotantos. According to the Institute of Neohellenic Research, thirteen paintings are attributed to Tzafouris. Active between 1480 and 1501, Tzafouris had a workshop in Heraklion, where he painted religious themes for local churches. His most notable works are the Madre della Consolazione and Christ Bearing the Cross.

The painting is a mixture of Italian and Greek Byzantine prototypes; it follows the traditional maniera greca and was influenced by Venetian painting. Christ Bearing the Cross is in the Metropolitan Museum of Art in New York.

== Description ==
The work is painted in egg tempera with gold leaf on wood with dimensions of 69.2 cm (27.25 in) x 54.6 cm (21.5 in). The icon was finished towards the end of the 15th century. Christ is shown carrying a cross. The scene is the traditional Golgotha portion of the Crucifixion sequence. The soldiers on the right are dressed in armor modeled after Venetian attire, while the soldiers on the left of the painting wear Byzantine- or Cretan-styled armor.

The soldiers' attire is painted in exquisite detail. The Italian Renaissance painting style closely resembles the sfumato technique. The artist is trying to escape the typical flattened surface prevalent within the Byzantine-influenced maniera greca. Tzafouris attempts to create the illusion of a foreground and a background. The gilded background further accentuates the figures and landscape. The geometric shape of the mountain is reminiscent of Michael Damaskinos's Adoration of the Kings. The painting features Latin and Greek inscriptions. There are five icons signed by the author that survived; Christ Bearing the Cross is one of them.

== Gallery ==
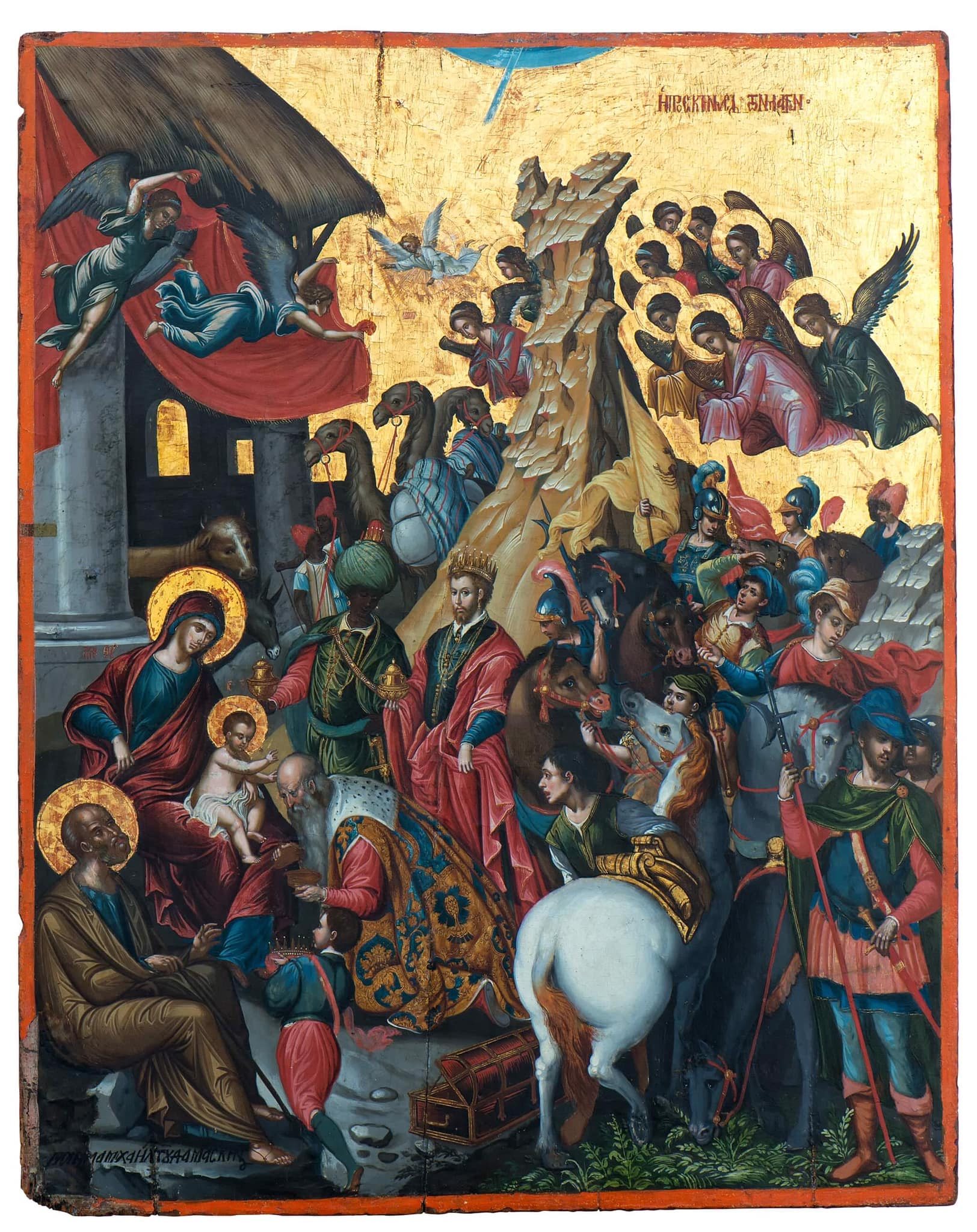
Damaskenos's Adoration of the Kings

Cimabue Christ Mocked

== See also ==
- The Dormition of the Virgin (Moskos)

== Bibliography ==
- Mantas, Apostolos (2018). Ο Κρητικός Ζωγράφος Νικόλαος Τζαφούρης Ενυπόγραφα και Αποδιδόμενα Εργα [Catalog of Nikolaos Tzafouris Signed and Attributed Works with Detailed Analysis (Greek)] (PDF). Ioannina Greece: The University of Ioannina Philosophical School.
