= Morsink Icon Gallery =

UNESCO World Heritage Site in Amsterdam

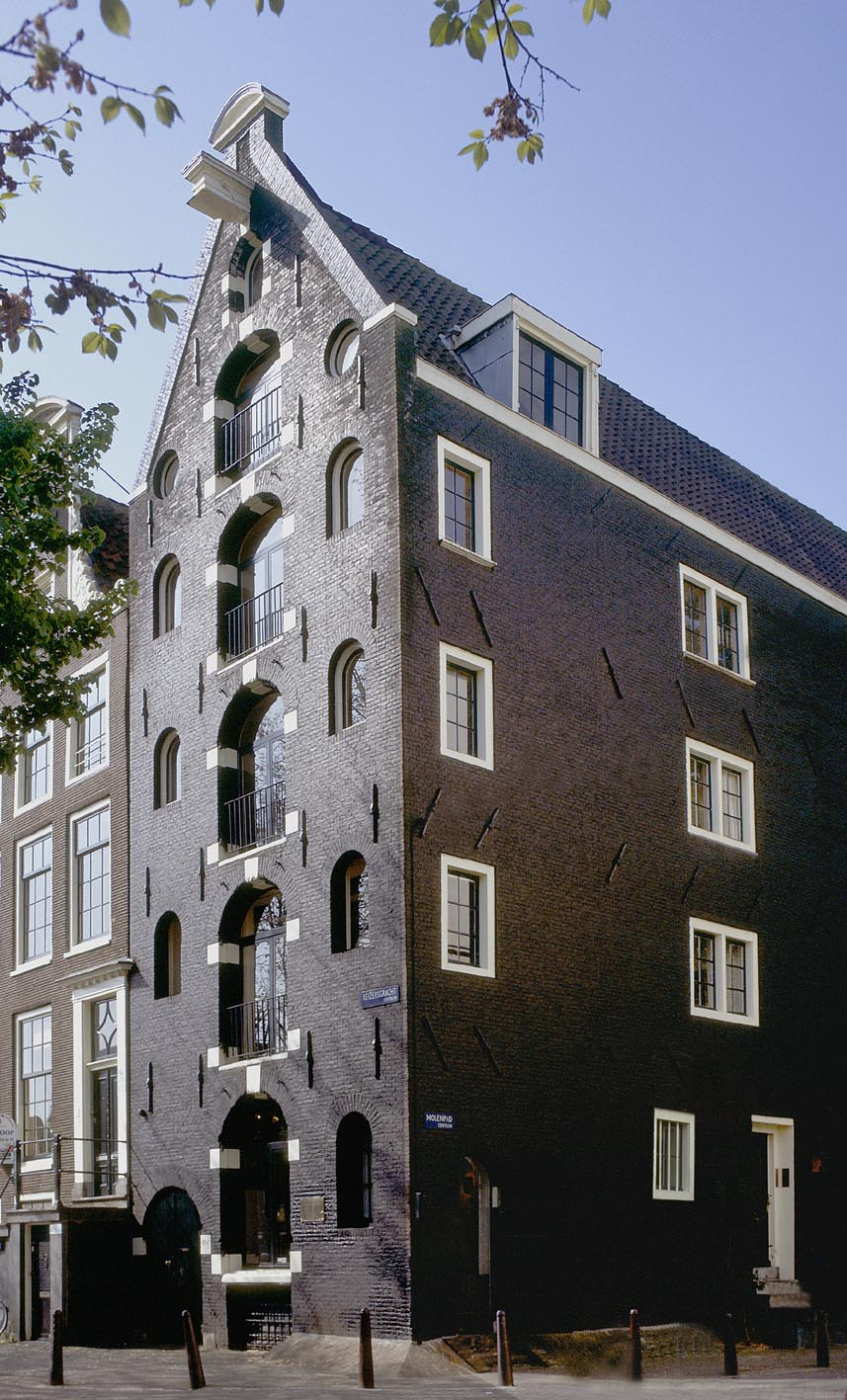
- Established: 1977
- Location: Keizersgracht 454, Amsterdam, Netherlands
- Coordinates: 52.36713132725137°N 4.884172682834184°E
- Type: Art gallery, Russian and Greek Icons, UNESCO World Heritage Site
- Directors: Simon Morsink and Hugo Morsink
- Website: www.morsink.com

Morsink Icon Gallery (previously called Jan Morsink Ikonen) was an international gallery in Amsterdam specialized in Russian and Greek icons dating from the fifteenth to the nineteenth century. The collection presented the masterpieces of iconographic schools of Moscow, Novgorod, Pskov, Palech and the isle of Crete. The gallery closed its doors in 2022, following the Russian invasion of Ukraine.

== History ==
Morsink Icon Gallery was established in 1977 as Jan Morsink Ikonen in Hengelo, Netherlands by Jan Morsink, who started the gallery out of interest for the art of the Orthodox world. After his death in 1992, his two sons, the art historian Simon Morsink and Hugo Morsink, who worked at that time as a real estate agent, continued the work of their father. They moved the gallery to Keizersgracht 454 in Amsterdam and focused on an international clientele. They also started participating in art fairs such as TEFAF Maastricht, TEFAF Basel, PAN Amsterdam, and Olympia London. In 2016 the name of the gallery was changed in Morsink Icon Gallery.

In May 2022, Simon and Hugo announced the gallery would close its doors on 1 July 2022.

== Exhibitions ==
During the 2014 Russian Art Week in London, UK Jan Morsink Iconen held an exhibition “Russian Icons: Spirit and Beauty” at Trinity House in Mayfair. The gallery presented 40 icons dating from the 15th to 19th centuries. The highlight of the exhibition was a 15-panel traveling iconostasis dating to 19th century, made by Old Believers.
