= Greek Madonna =

Painting by Giovanni Bellini

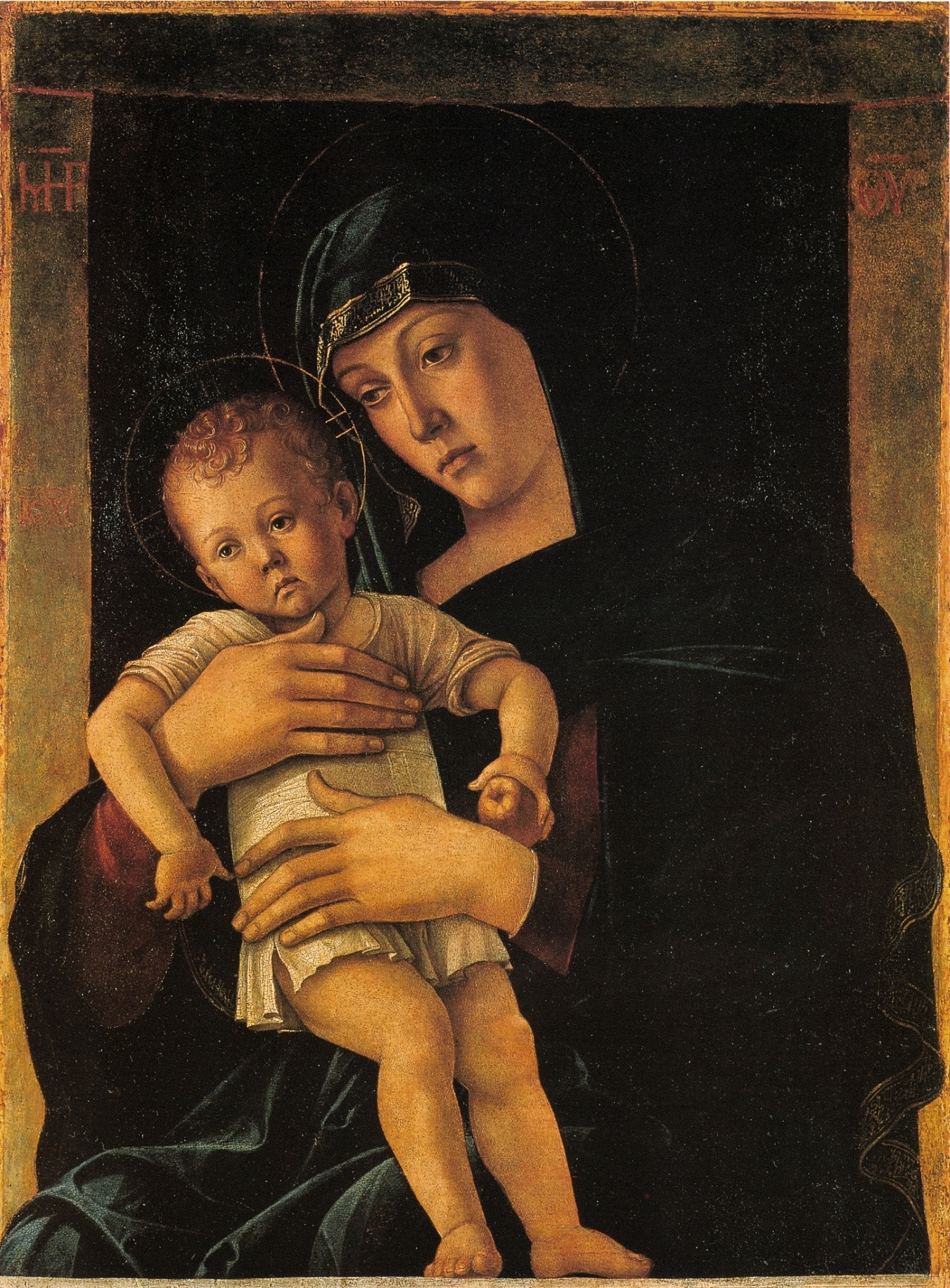
- Artist: Giovanni Bellini
- Year: 1460–1470
- Medium: tempera on panel
- Dimensions: 82 cm × 62 cm (32 in × 24 in)
- Location: Pinacoteca di Brera, Milan
- Website: Catalogue entry

The Greek Madonna is a 1460–1470 tempera-on-panel painting by the Italian Renaissance artist Giovanni Bellini. It is named after the Greek monograms at top left and top right and after the major influence of Byzantine icons on the painting. The Christ Child holds a golden apple, perhaps referring to the Judgement of Paris and to Mary as the "new Venus".

Pellizzari's theory that the work originally had a golden background like an icon was disproved by a 1986–87 restoration, which showed that the original background had been a blue sky, seen either side of a central curtain. The curtain remains, but the sky was hidden in the 16th century by two gold stripes. Infrared examination during the restoration also revealed the panel's preparation with glue and plaster and the chiaroscuro underdrawing, both typical of Bellini and both also mentioned in Paolo Pino's 1548 Dialogo di pittura.

When the French invaded Venice in the late 18th century the painting was in the offices of the Regulatori di Scrittura in the Doge's Palace. It was confiscated and in 1808 assigned to the new Pinacoteca di Brera in Milan, where it now hangs.

== See also ==
- List of works by Giovanni Bellini
