= Nikolaos Tzafouris =

Greek Renaissance painter (1468–1501)

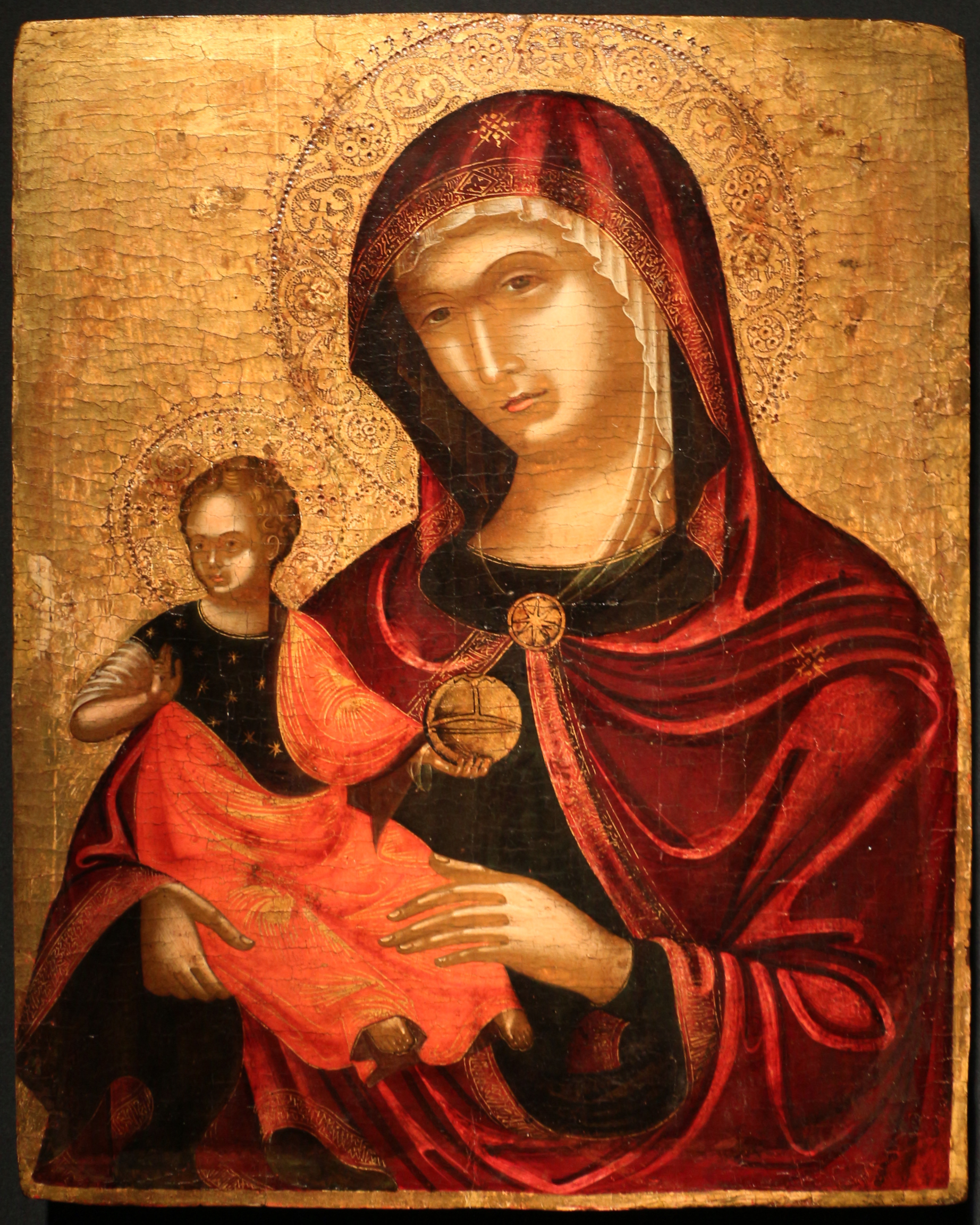
- Madre della Consolazione 1490
- Born: 1468; Crete, Greece
- Died: 1501 (aged 32–33); Crete, Greece
- Movement: Cretan school

Nikolaos Tzafouris (Greek: Νικόλαος Ζαφούρης η Τζαφούρης; 1468–1501; also Niccolo, Niccolò, Niccolö, Zafuri, Zafuris) was a Greek Renaissance painter. He was one of the founders of the Cretan school. He was influenced by Angelos Akotantos. His works influenced Emmanuel Tzanes, Elias Moskos, Georgios Klontzas and Theodoros Poulakis. Tzafouris was one of the most respected artists in Crete. His most notable work is Madre della Consolazione. The painting exhibits a combination of Byzantine and Italian styles. Another notable painter in Crete around the same time was Andreas Pavias. According to the Institute of Neohellenic Research, thirteen paintings are attributed to Tzafouris.

== History ==
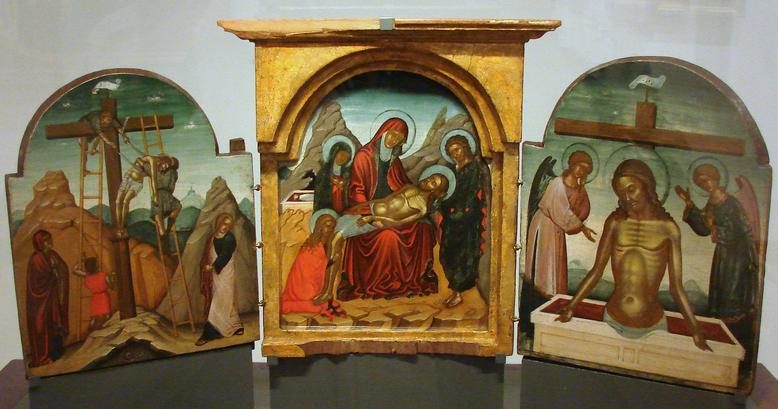
Deposition, Lamentation and Resurrection triptych by Nikolaos Tzafouris, National Museum, Warsaw, between 1489 and 1501

Nikolaos was born in Crete. He was influenced by Angelos Akotantos. The artist traveled to Venice to continue his painting education. He was exposed to the works of Giovanni Bellini and may have trained with him. He returned to Crete towards the end of his life where he had a successful workshop. His workshop mass-produced icons.

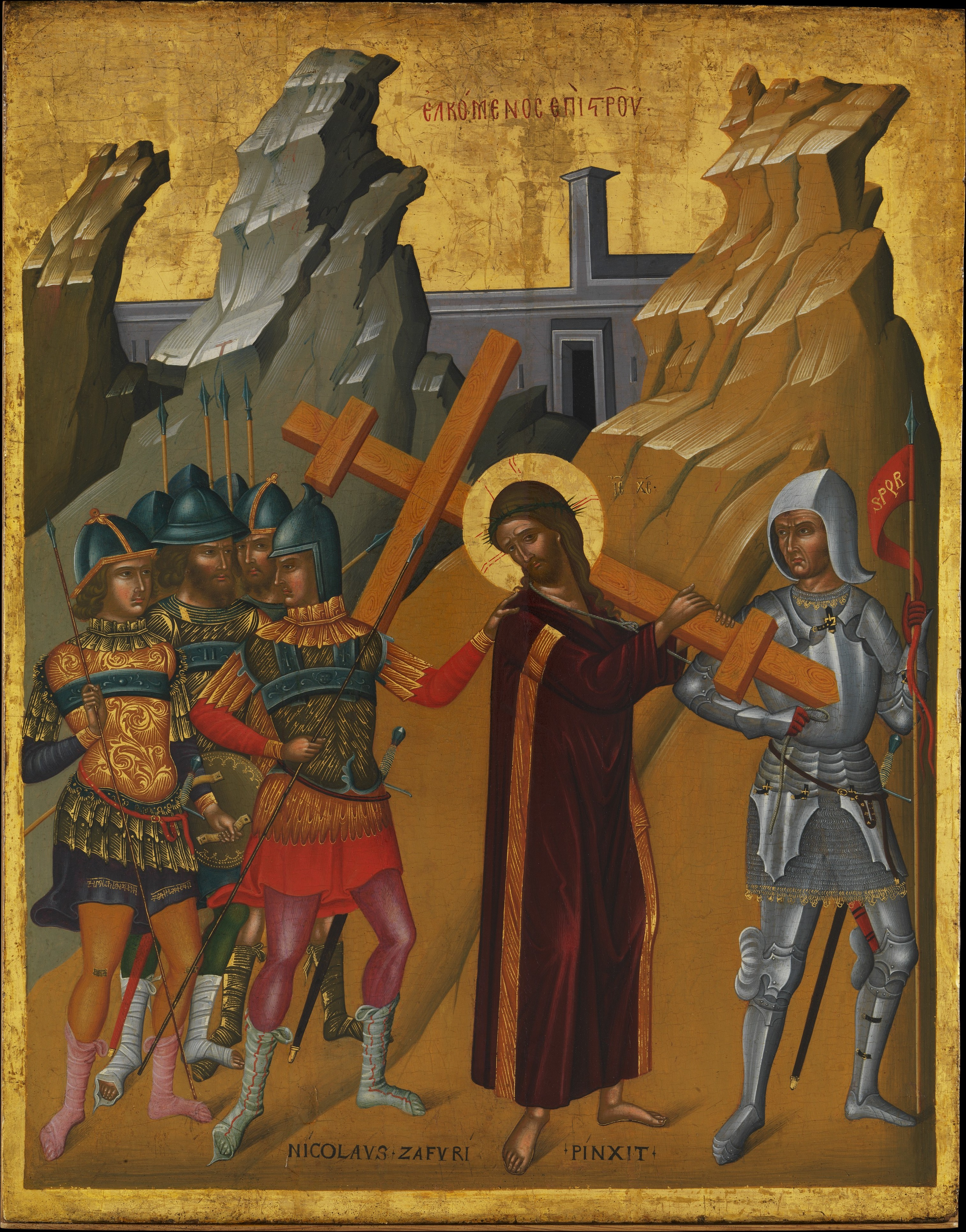
icon Christ Bearing the Cross by Nikolaos Tzafouris, Metropolitan Museum of Art, New York City

He painted a new style Madonna called Madre della Consolazione which was considered the Italian style and was the standard for the next hundred years. He also emulated Bellini's Pieta which was also heavily copied.

Historians have records of the painter's activities in Crete between 1487 and 1501 involving economic affairs. In 1492, he worked with famous Greek painter Georgios Vlastos and the sculptor Nikolaos Varvarigos. The artists worked on a Catholic church in Nafplio called Pala D'altare. Regrettably, nothing from the church survived. The existing documents notate Tzafouris had a workshop in Heraklion. Tzafouris painted religious themes for local churches. He died in Heraklion around 1501. Tzafouris was mentioned in a will found in Venetian archives on February 23, 1537.

Five of his signed icons survive. His works followed the maniera greca tradition but also exhibited qualities of Byzantine paintings and frescos. Many Cretan painters began to adopt a style mixing Byzantine and Italian techniques. One work executed by Nikolaos Tzafouris was a triptych Pietà with Saints Francis and Mary Magdalen which can be found at the Ashmolean Museum. Another example of signed icon from Nikolaos Tzafouris, Christ Bearing the Cross, is in the collection of Metropolitan Museum of Art NYC.

== Gallery ==
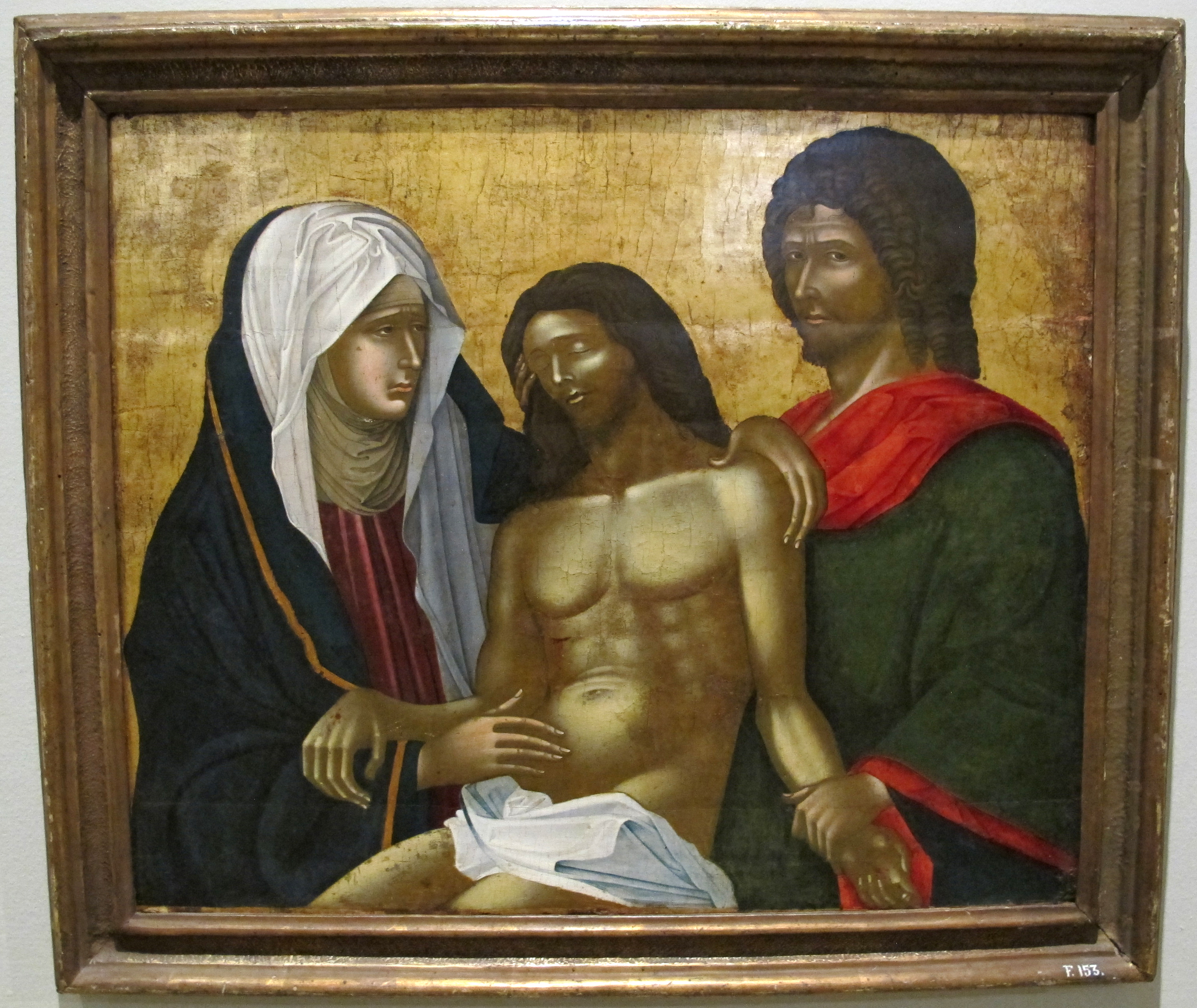
Pietà after Bellini

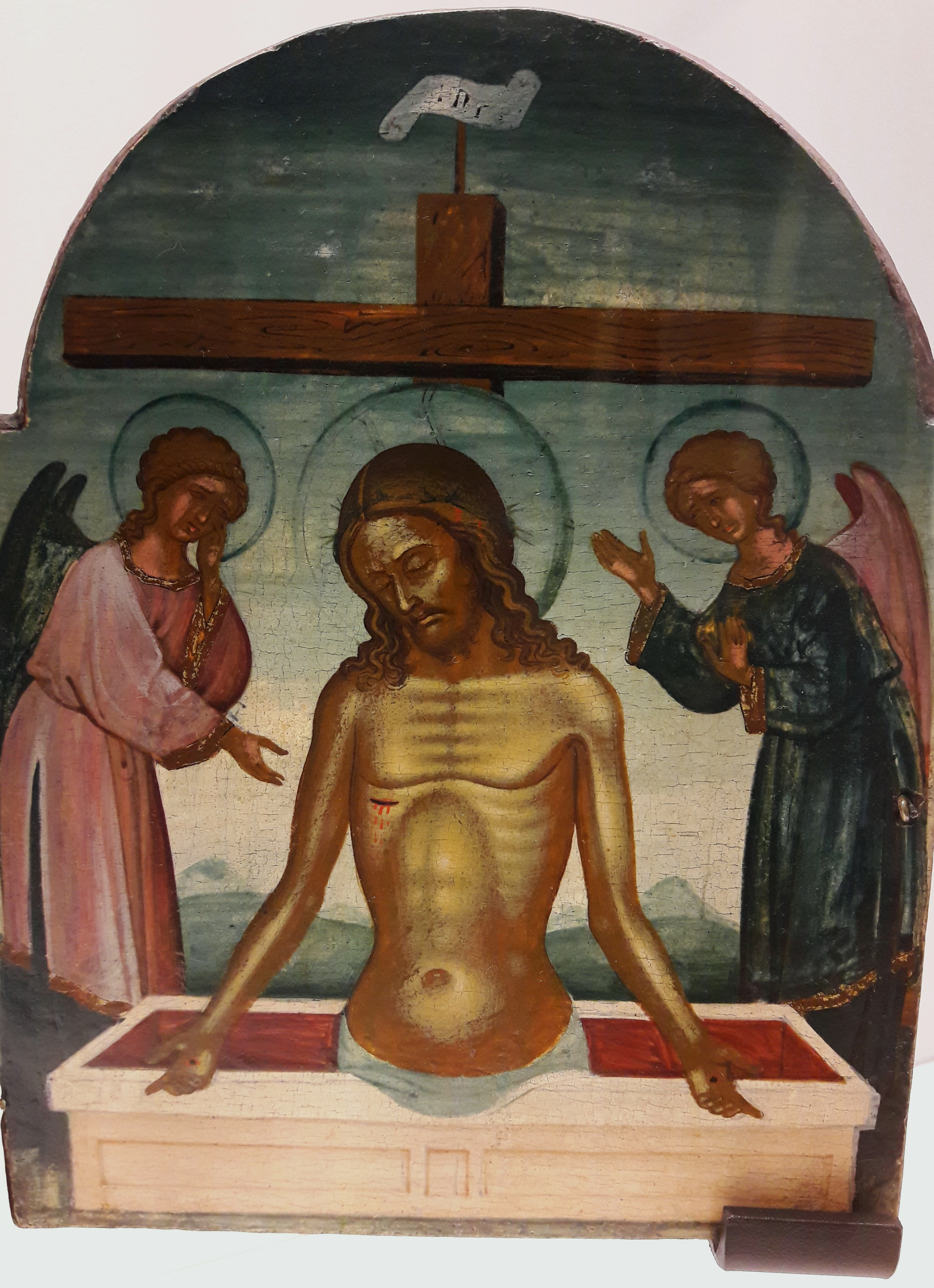
triptych Resurrection

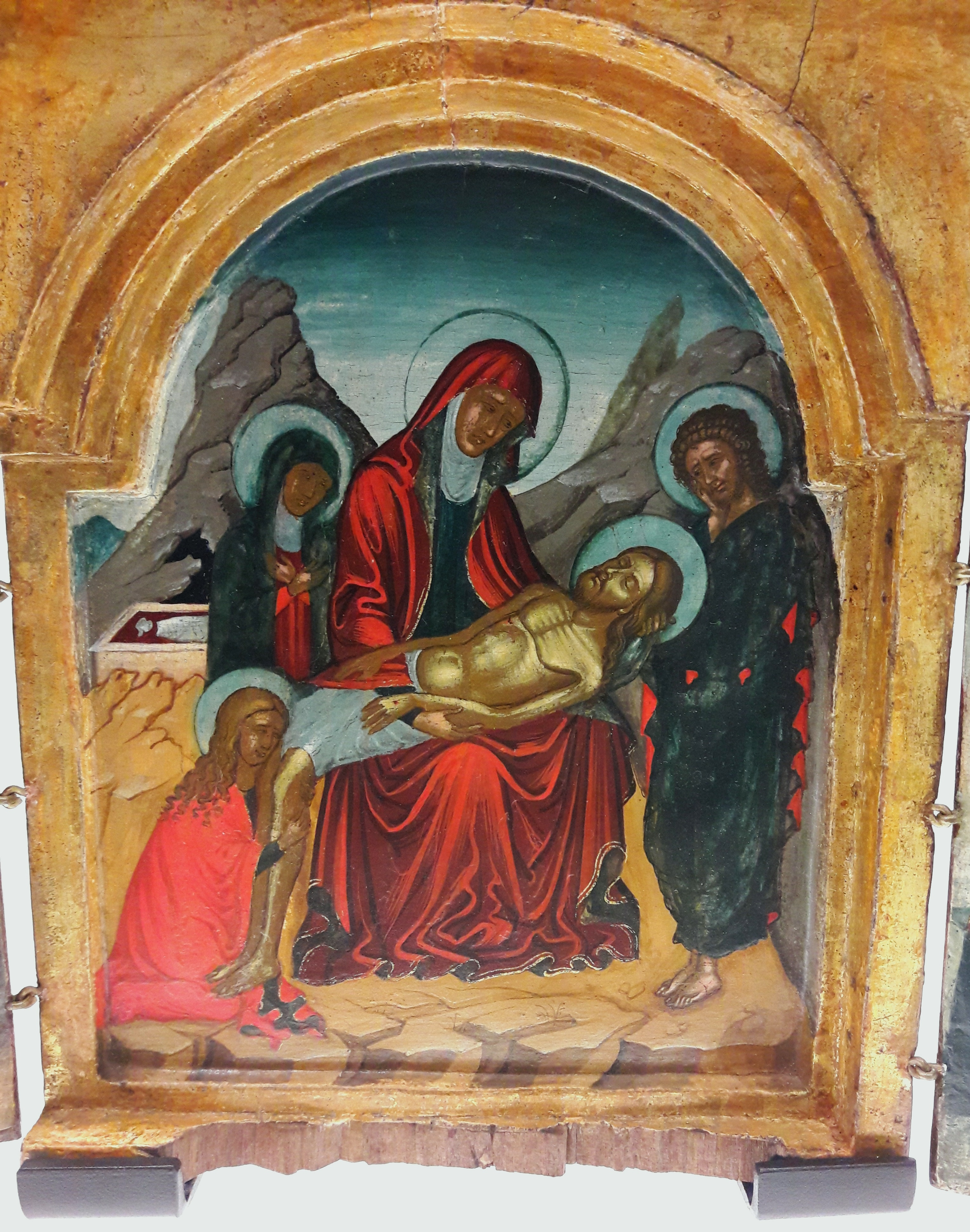
triptych Lamentation

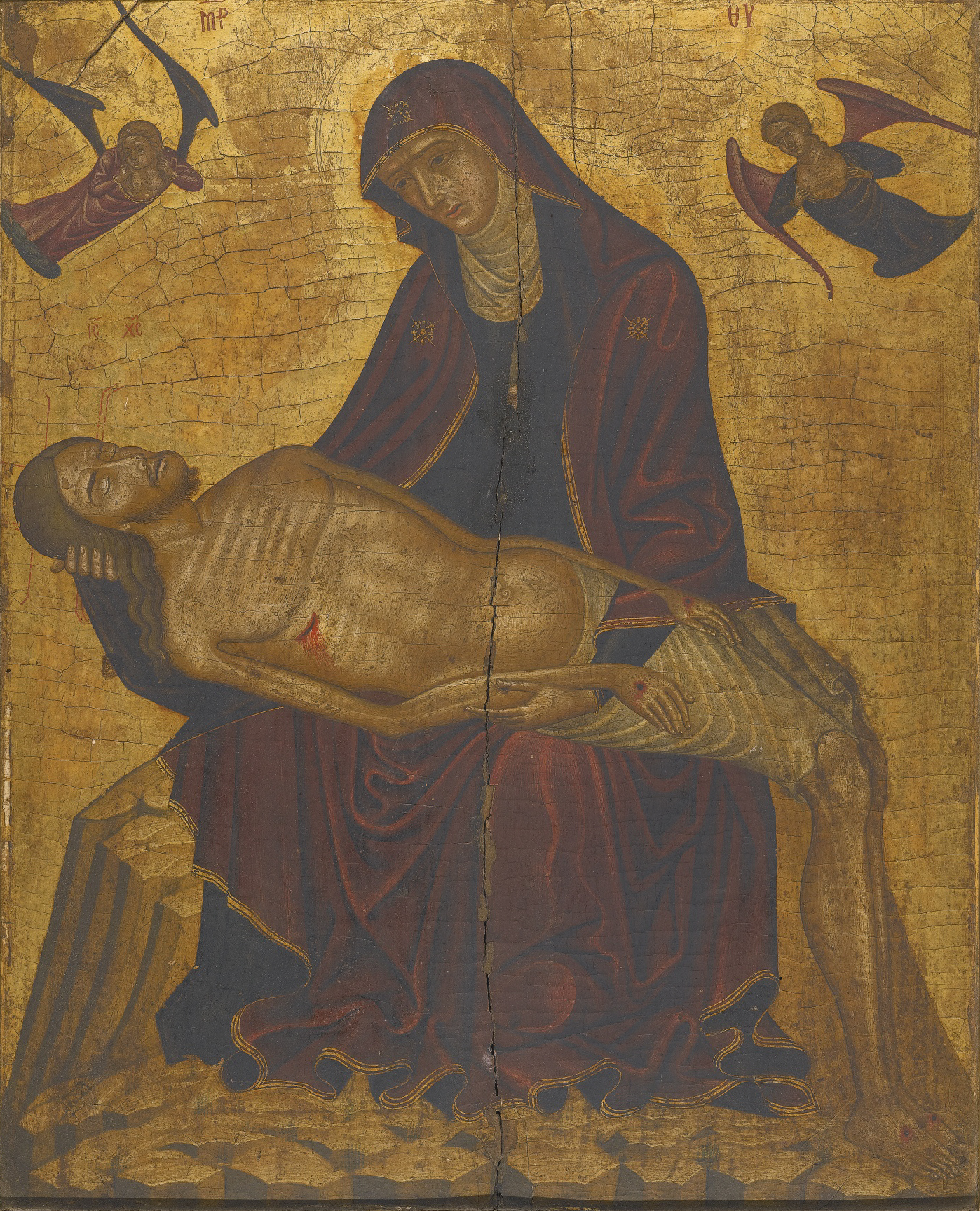
Lamentation of Jesus

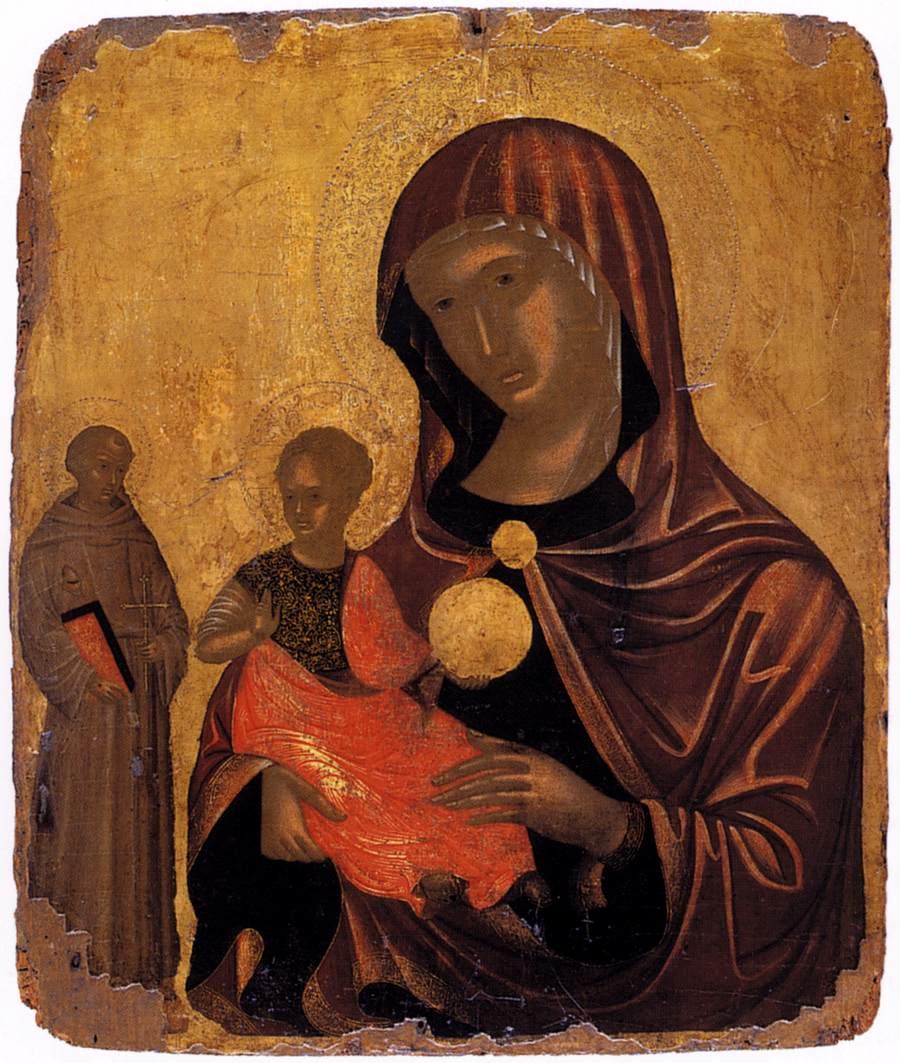
Virgin and Child and St Francis

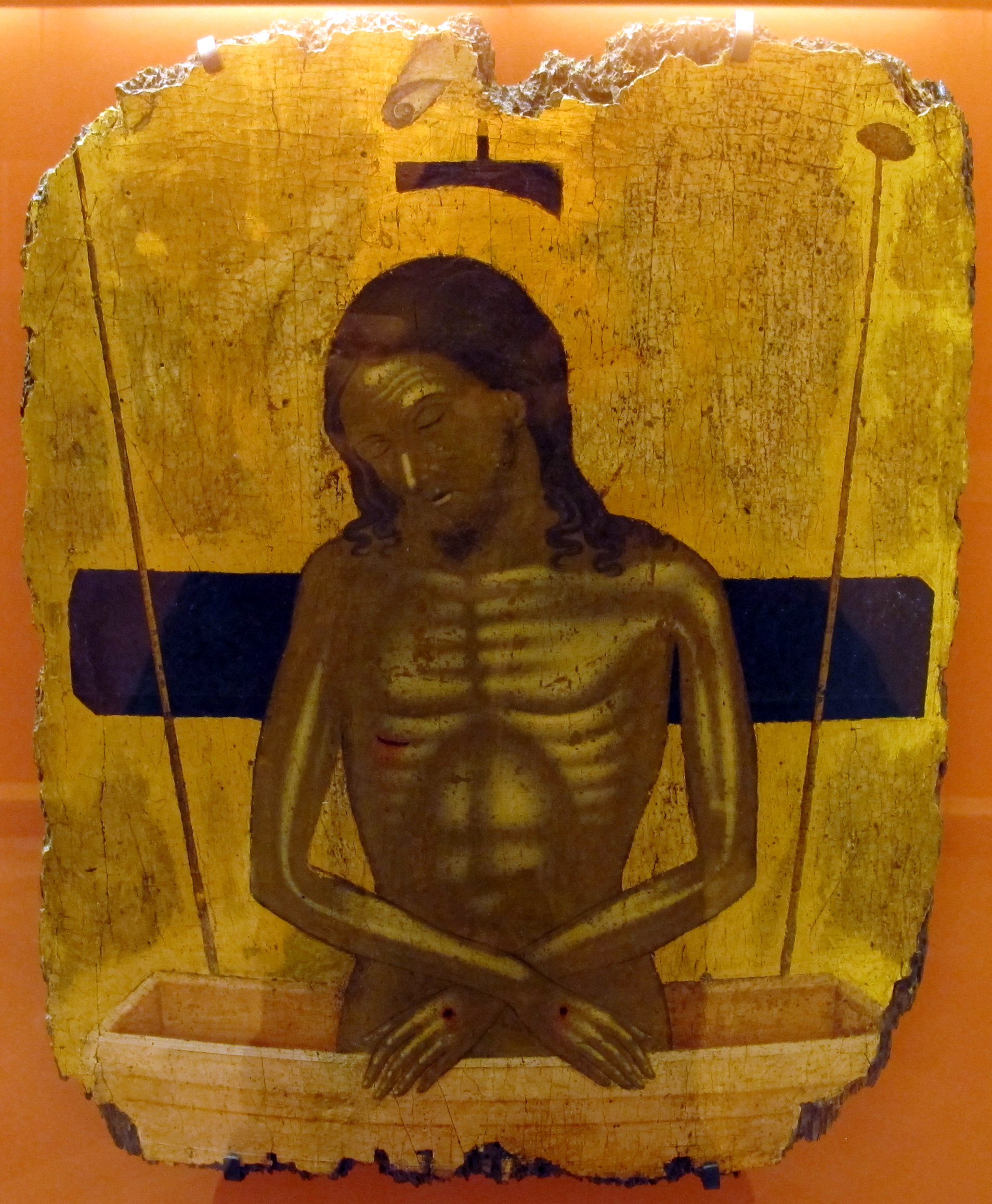
Pietà

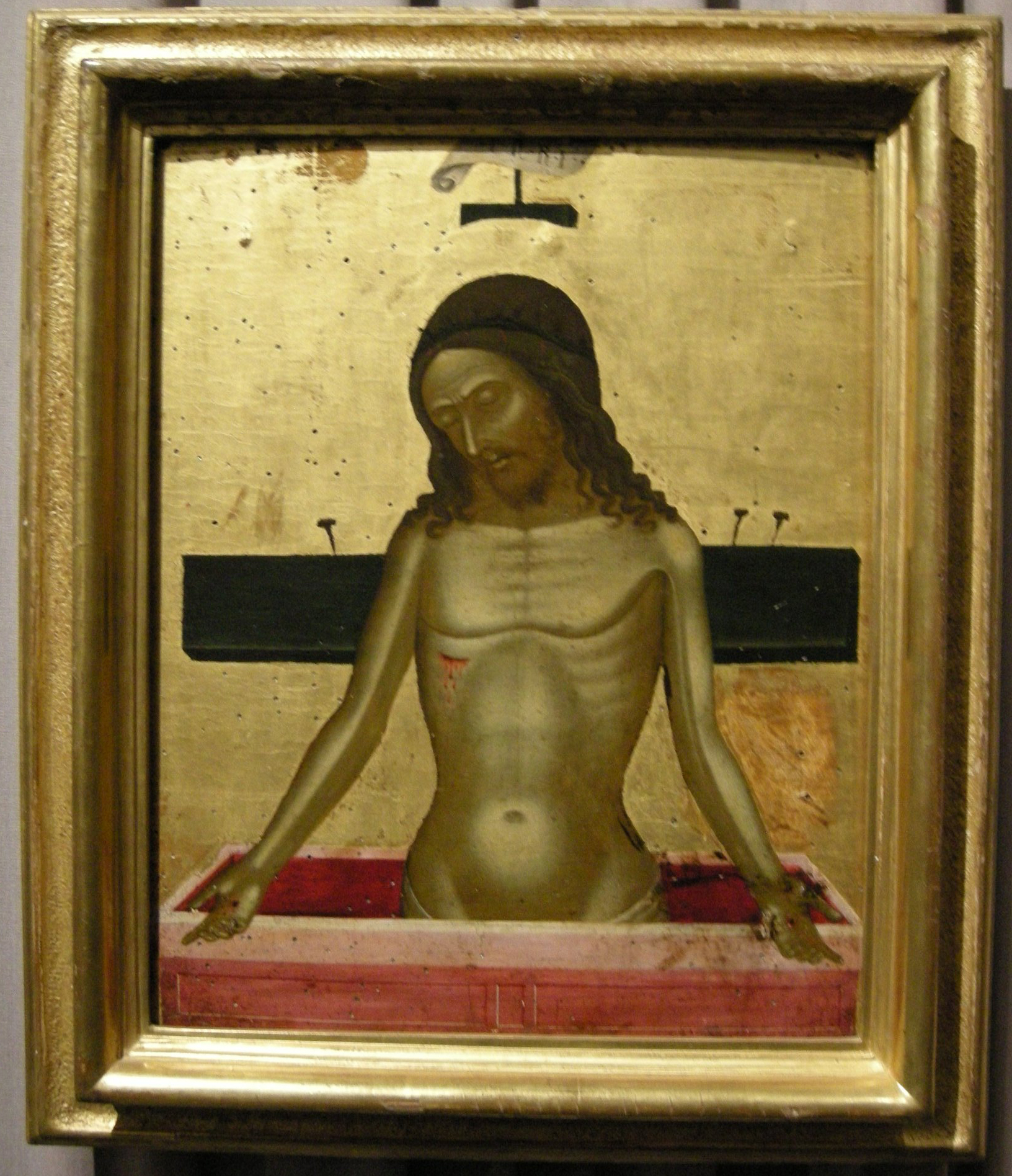
Pietà

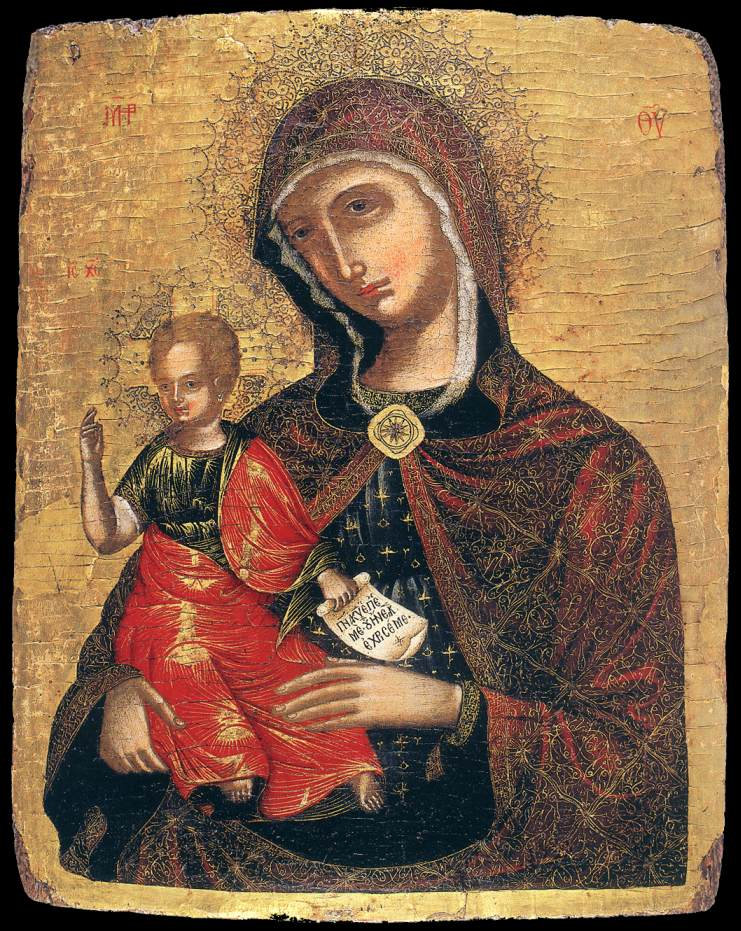
Virgin and Child

== See also ==
- Maniera greca

== Bibliography ==
- Hatzidakis, Manolis (1987). Greek painters after the fall (1450–1830) Volume A. Athens, GR: Center for Modern Greek Studies E.I.E.
- Hatzidakis, Manolis & Drakopoulou, Eugenia (1997). Greek painters after the fall (1450-1830) Volume B. Athens, GR: Center for Modern Greek Studies E.I.E.
- Drakopoulou, Eugenia (2010). Greek painters after the fall (1450-1830) Volume C. Athens, GR: Center for Modern Greek Studies E.I.E.
- Voulgaropoulou, Margarita (2020). "From Domestic Devotion to the Church Altar: Venerating Icons in Late Medieval and Early Modern Adriatic". Religions. 10 (6): 390. doi:10.3390/rel10060390.
- Richardson, Carol M. (2007). Locating Renaissance Art. United Kingdom: Yale University Press. ISBN 9780300121889.
- Mantas, Apostolos (2018). Ο Κρητικός Ζωγράφος Νικόλαος Τζαφούρης Ενυπόγραφα και Αποδιδόμενα Εργα [Catalog of Nikolaos Tzafouris Signed and Attributed Works with Detailed Analysis (Greek)] (PDF). Ioannina Greece: The University of Ioannina Philosophical School.
