= Nikolaos Gripiotis =

Greek painter (1465–1525)

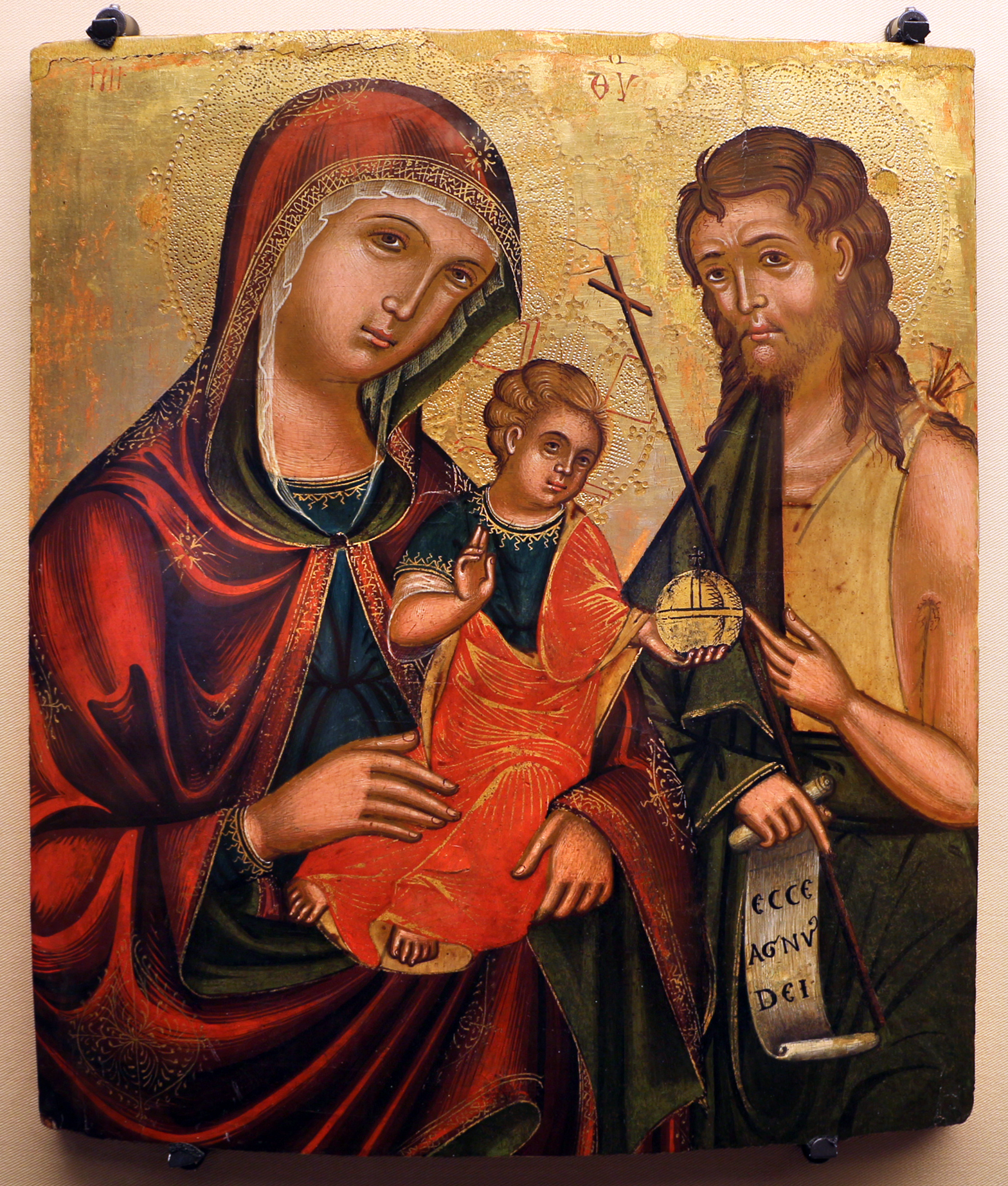
- Cretan icon from the era of Gripiotis
- Born: 1465; Heraklion, Crete, Greece
- Died: 1525 (aged 59–60); Heraklion, Crete, Greece
- Known for: Mass Producing Greek Icons in the 1500s
- Movement: Cretan school
- Spouse: Maria
- Children: Ioannis, Kassandra, Francheskina
- Patrons: Giorgio Basejo and Petro Varsama
- Occupation: Painter
- Years active: 1480–1525
- Era: Greek Renaissance
- Style: Maniera Greca
- Relatives: Brother-in-law Arsenius Apostolius

Nikolaos Gripiotis (Greek: Νικόλαος Γριπιώτης; 1465–1525), also known as Nicolò Gripioti, was a Greek painter and teacher. He was a prominent member of the Cretan school in the early 1500s, working alongside such practitioners as Michael Fokas and Giorgio Miçocostantin (Georgios Mitsoconstantinos). No work survives bearing his signature, but documents from the period record thousands of icons produced by his workshop. Nikolaos's son Ioannis Gripiotis also became a prominent painter. The family was related by marriage to Arsenius Apostolius.

== History ==
Nikolaos Gripiotis was born in Heraklion, on the island of Crete. His father was a jeweler named Marino. Nikolaos and his wife Maria, the sister of Arsenius Apostolius, had three children, Kassandra, Francheskina, and Ioannis. Francheskina married Mattheos de Mediolano.

Preserved documents describe Gripiotis's activity as a professional painter from 1480 to 1525. The peak of his career was a commission for 700 icons in 1499, shared between Gripiotis, Michael Fokas and George Mitsoconstantinos. 400 of the paintings were to be in the Greek style, based upon Byzantine prototypes, and 300 in the Italian style, based upon Western interpretations of the Byzantine tradition. The works were painted on three different sizes of panel; a record preserves Fokas's order to famous local woodcarver Giorgio Sclavo for a thousand such panels, placed a month before the big commission. On July 4, 1499, Michael Fokas was contracted to paint 100 icons in a month and a half. He also promised 100 more icons painted by Gripiotis. On June 5, 1505, Gripiotis received 6 golden Venetian ducats and 5 superpyras for an icon of Saint Christopher, intended for the chapel of Petros Bono in the Catholic monastery of Saint Peter.

Gripiotis also worked as an instructor in the craft of icon painting. In 1493, he accepted Marino Nicola di Giorgio as his student. He signed another contract in 1503, agreeing to train Ioannis Synadenos for four years.

Icon painters of the period did not sign their works, and consequently no extant paintings can be attributed to Gripiotis. There may be unidentified products of his workshop among the thousands of contemporary Cretan icons which survive. His signature would have been Χείρ Γριπιώτης or in latin Nicolò Gripioti Pinxit.

== Gallery ==
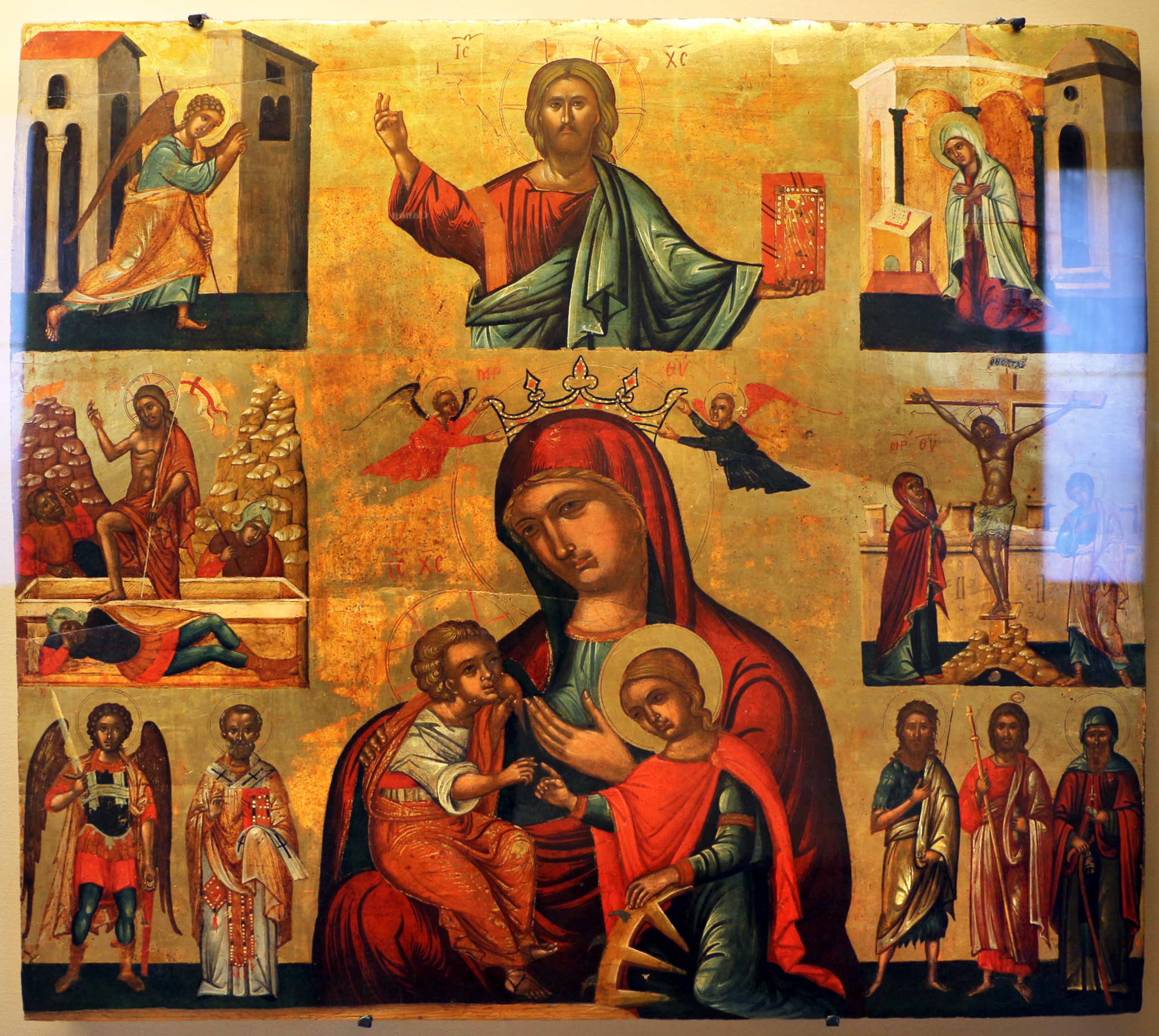
Italian Style Cretan Prototype

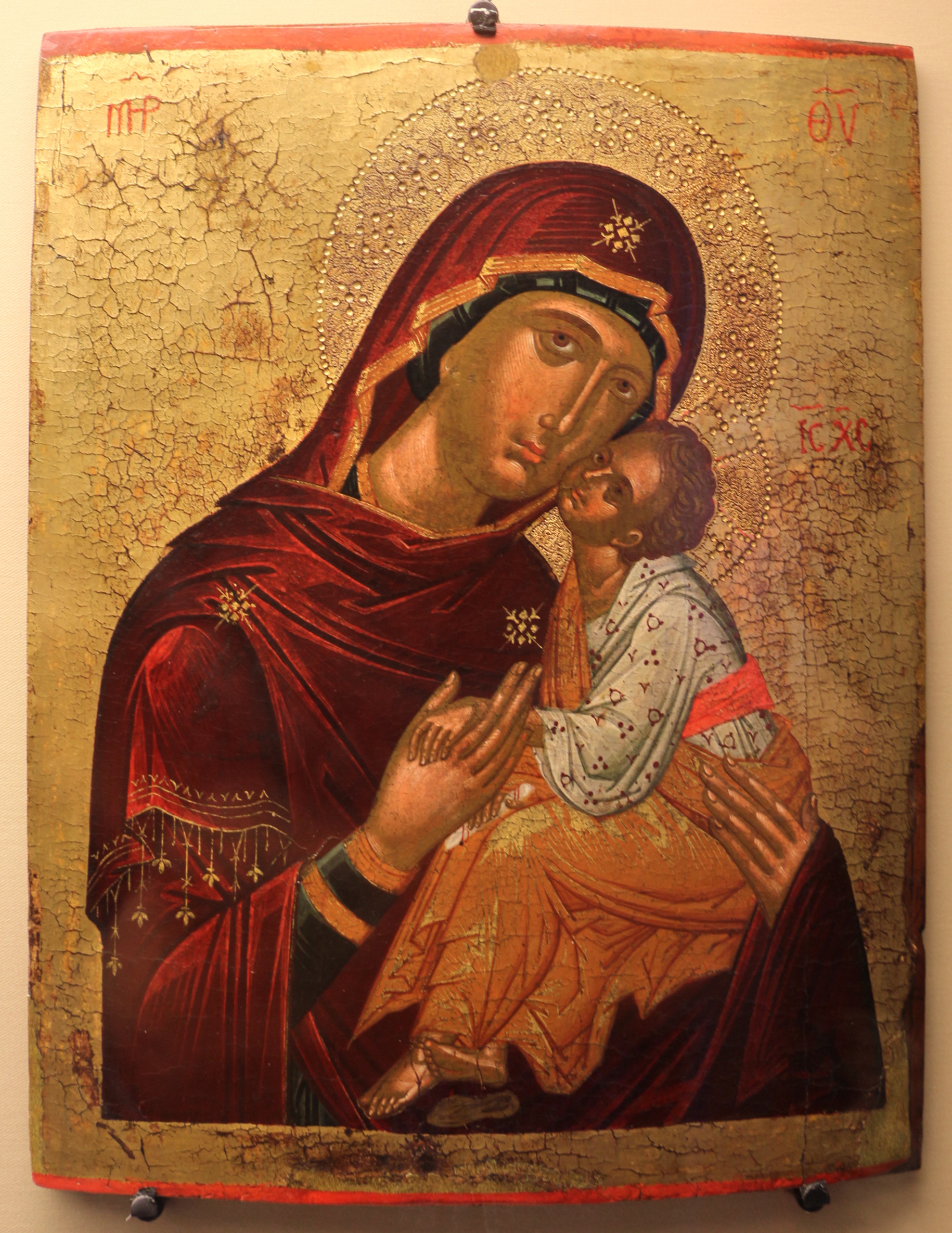
Greek Style Cretan Prototype

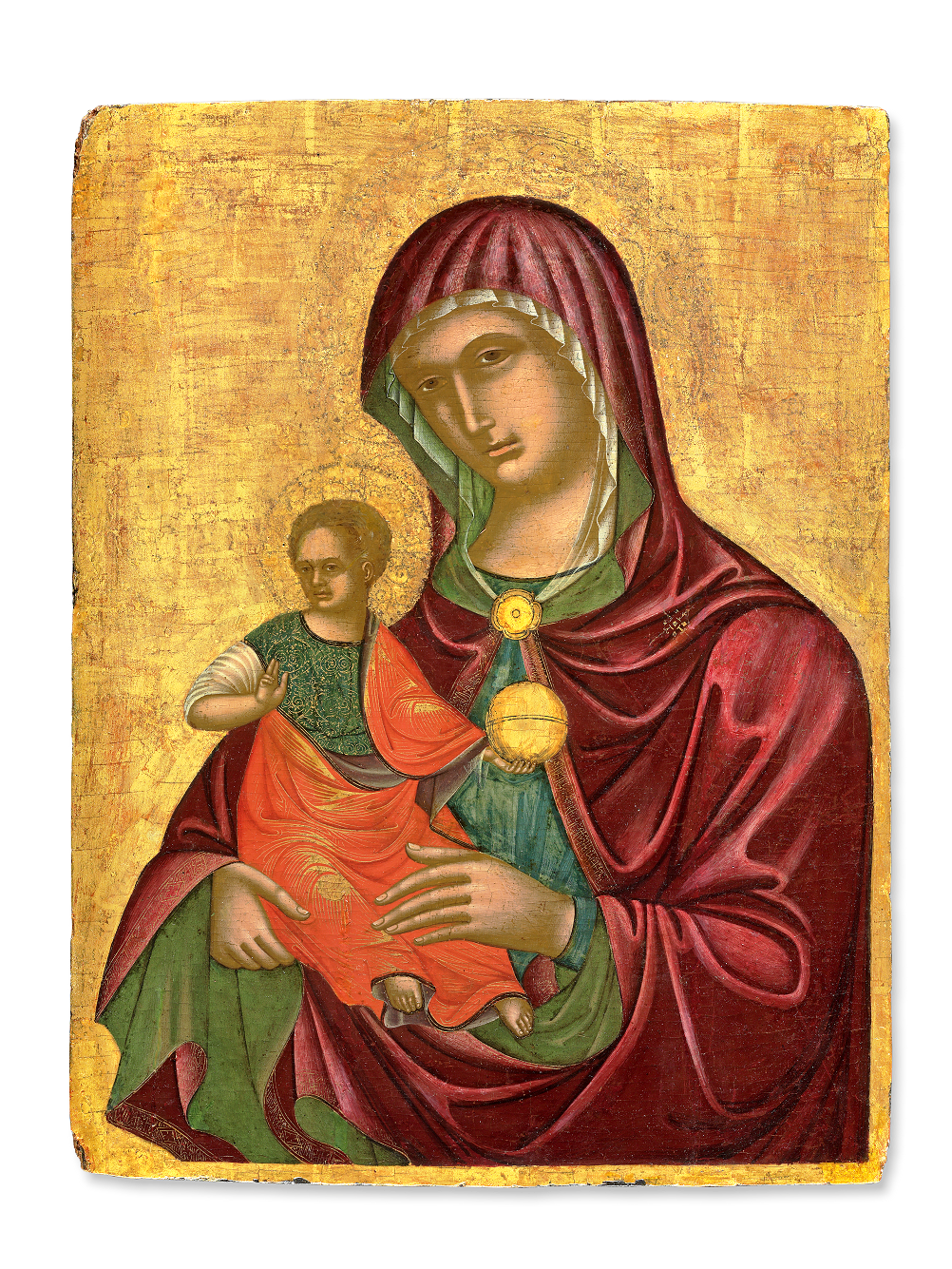
Italian Style Cretan Prototype

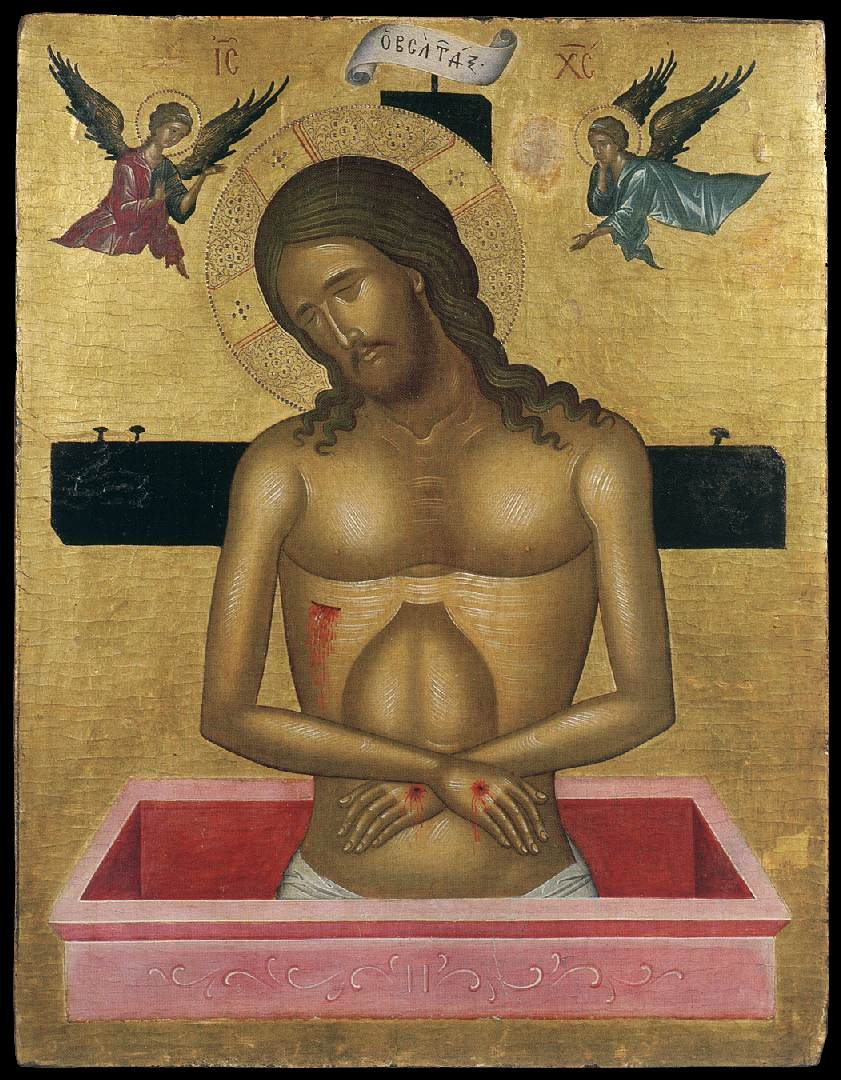
Mass Produced Cretan Prototype

== Bibliography ==
- Hatzidakis, Manolis (1987). Έλληνες Ζωγράφοι μετά την Άλωση (1450-1830). Τόμος 1: Αβέρκιος - Ιωσήφ [Greek Painters after the Fall of Constantinople (1450-1830). Volume 1: Averkios - Iosif]. Athens: Center for Modern Greek Studies, National Research Foundation. hdl:10442/14844. ISBN 960-7916-01-8.
- Voulgaropoulou, Margarita (2020). "From Domestic Devotion to the Church Altar: Venerating Icons in the Late Medieval and Early Modern Adriatic". Religions. 10 (6): 390. doi:10.3390/rel10060390.
- Hatzidakis, Manolis; Drakopoulou, Evgenia (1997). Έλληνες Ζωγράφοι μετά την Άλωση (1450-1830). Τόμος 2: Καβαλλάρος - Ψαθόπουλος [Greek Painters after the Fall of Constantinople (1450-1830). Volume 2: Kavallaros - Psathopoulos]. Athens: Center for Modern Greek Studies, National Research Foundation. hdl:10442/14088. ISBN 960-7916-00-X.
- Kondi, B. (1989). Τὰ Εθνικὰ Οἰκογενειακὰ Όνόματα στὴν Κρήτη κατὰ τὴ βενετοκρατία (13ος-17ος αἰ.) [The Family Names of People Residing in Crete from the 12th-17th Century] (PDF). Athens GR: The Public Research Foundation of Byzantine Research.
