= Virgin of the Passion =

Painting by Emmanuel Tzanfournaris

- Παναγία του Πάθους (Greek), Vergine della Passione (Italian)
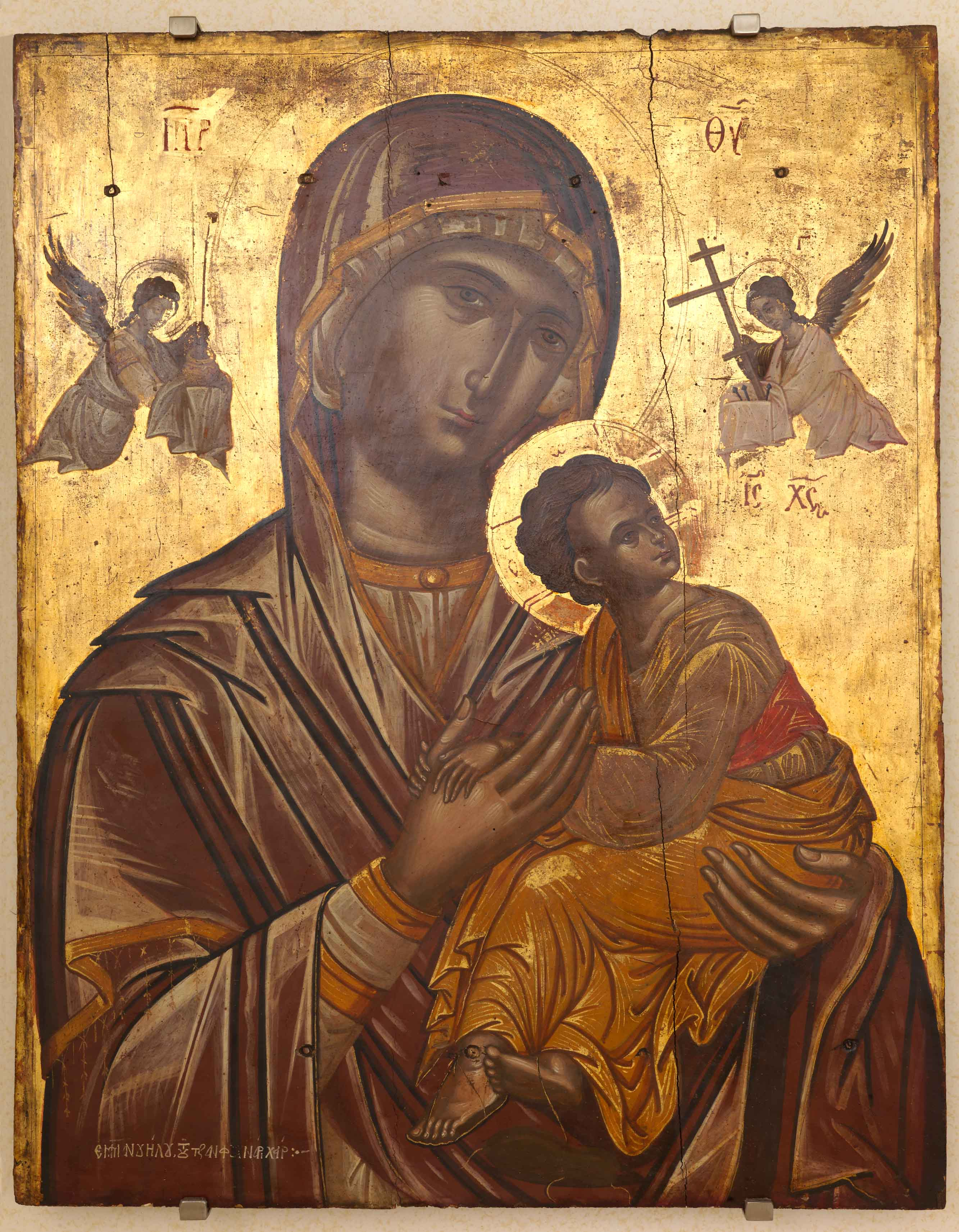
- Artist: Emmanuel Tzanfournaris
- Year: 1585–1630
- Medium: Tempera on wood
- Movement: Late Cretan School
- Subject: Mary (as Theotokos) and the Child Jesus
- Dimensions: 83.3 cm × 66.5 cm (32.8 in × 26.2 in)
- Location: Hellenic Institute of Venice, Venice, Italy
- Owner: Hellenic Institute of Venice

The Virgin of the Passion is a rendition of the Madonna and Child by Greek painter Emmanuel Tzanfournaris. He was born in Corfu to the painter Georgios Tzanfournaris. By age twenty-nine Emmanuel moved to Venice. Emmanuel's teacher was painter Thomas Bathas, whom he met on the island Corfu. Bathas left Emmanuel a sizable fortune in his will. Both painters created versions of the Virgin and Child. The Bathas version is called Virgin Nikopoios.

The Panagia and Child have been painted many times by Greek and Italian artists. According to tradition, Luke the Evangelist was the first to paint a portrait of the two figures. The painting style has roots in Greek-Italian Byzantine art. The Tzanfournaris version is part of the collection of the Hellenic Institute of Venice Museum.

== Description ==
The painting is egg tempera and gold leaf on wood panel. The dimensions are 83.3 by 66.5 centimeters (32.8 by 26.2 in), and it was completed between 1585 and 1630. The painting features the Virgin holding the infant Jesus. The icon depicts the Virgin Mary up to the waist holding Christ with her left hand. The toddler looks away. He leans towards her and rests both hands on his mother's right hand, embracing his mother.

The artist chooses a superlative tone of brown to exhibit the Virgin's attire. The clothing is presented with lines, striations, curves, and clear folds of fabric. The brown color shading and tones blend perfectly. There is clear detail in the face and hands of the virgin. The toddler wears his traditional orange attire. The Virgin's clothing is also decorated with a similar color. The gold background was well preserved. Two angels are at the top, the angel to our right carries the cross of passion. The second angel to our left carries a sphere, jar, and blanket.

The position of the Panagia and Child is the traditional Hodegetria (Our Lady of the Way) in Italian La Madonna Odigitria. There are three versions of the position. In the first style, Jesus looks away from the Virgin, in the second type, Jesus looks at the audience. In the third Version, Jesus looks at the Virgin Mary. Although the subject is similar among artists of the style, each painting has its own unique character and identity.

== Gallery ==
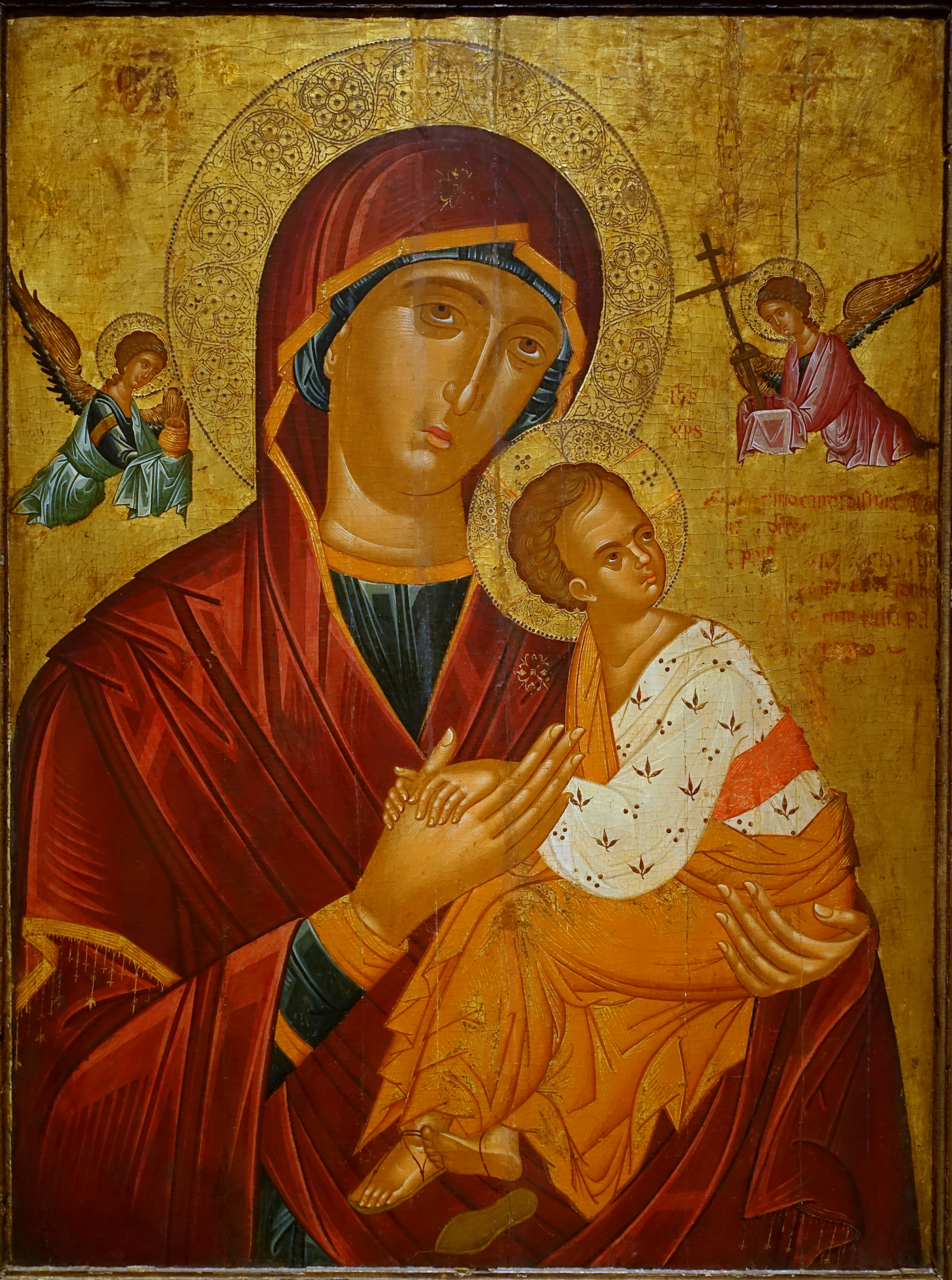
Virgin and Child Looking Away (Ritzos)

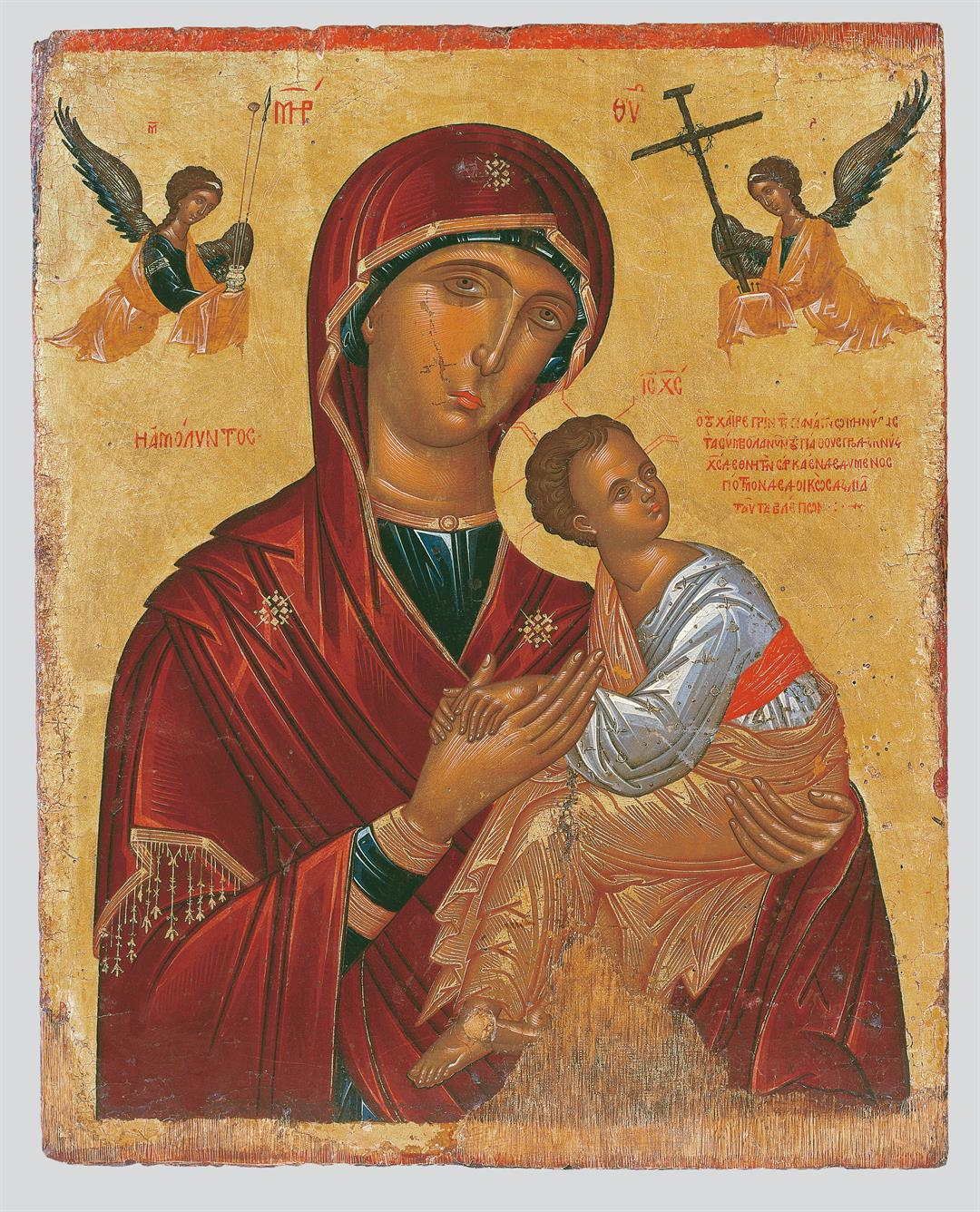
Virgin and Child Looking Away (Lambardos)

== Bibliography ==
- Tselenti-Papadopoulou, Niki G. (2002). Οι Εικονες της Ελληνικης Αδελφοτητας της Βενετιας απο το 16ο εως το Πρωτο Μισο του 20ου Αιωνα: Αρχειακη Τεκμηριωση [The Icons of the Greek Brotherhood of Venice from 1600 to First Half of the 20th Century] (PDF) (in Greek). Athens: Ministry of Culture Publication of the Archaeological Bulletin No. 81. ISBN 960-214-221-9.
