= Portrait of Gabriel Severus =

Painting by Thomas Bathas

- Προσωπογραφία του Γαβριήλ Σεβήρου (Greek), Ritratto di Gabriele Severo (Italian)
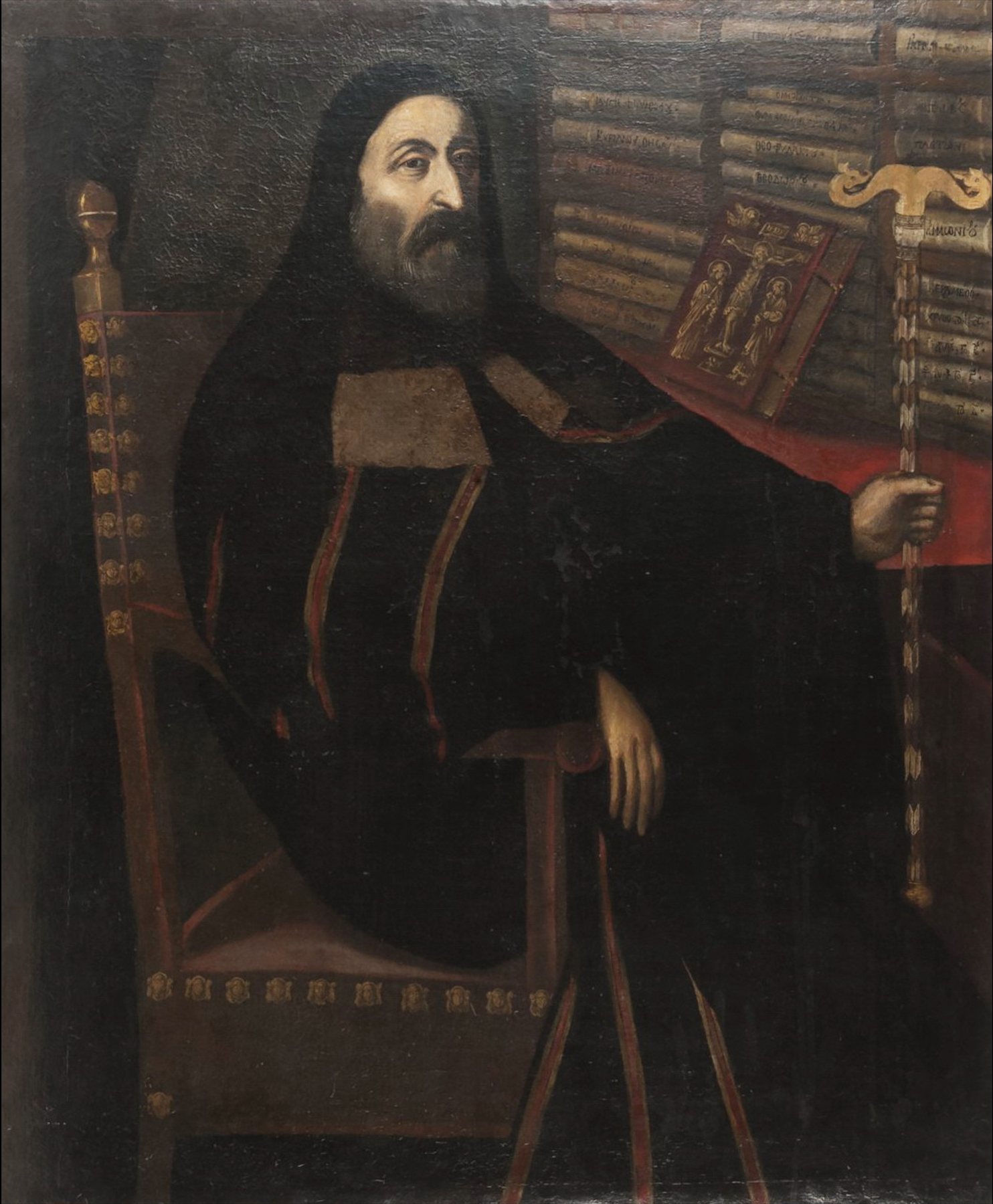
- Artist: Thomas Bathas
- Year: c. 1577–1599
- Medium: oil on canvas
- Subject: Gabriel Severus
- Dimensions: 103 cm × 84.5 cm (40.5 in × 33.2 in)
- Location: Hellenic Institute of Venice
- Owner: Hellenic Institute of Venice

Portrait of Gabriel Severus is an oil painting by Thomas Bathas. Bathas was active in Heraklion, Venice, and Corfu during the second half of the 16th century. He was close friends with Gabriel Severus, the Metropolitan of Philadelphia, whose seat was moved from Philadelphia to Venice in 1577. According to the will of Bathas, he bequeathed Gabriel Severus a silver cup. He also made Severus the executor of his will.

The portrait is one of the few works Bathas created following the prevalent technique in Venice during the Italian Renaissance. His typical style was the traditional maniera greca. The paintings were in high demand in Venice during the period. Michael Damaskinos and Thomas Bathas were more loyal to the maniera greca than El Greco, who completely converted to the Spanish Renaissance style. The Portrait of Gabriel Severus is a testimony that Baths was conversant in both styles. The portrait is now part of the collection of the Hellenic Institute of Venice in Italy. His student Emmanuel Tzanfournaris also created his own portrait of Gabriel Severus.

== Description ==
The work is an oil painting on canvas with dimensions 103 cm (40.5 in) x 84.5 cm (33.2 in). It was completed between 1577 and 1599. The portrait features the Metropolitan Gabriel Severus in his religious robe. The robe is an example of 16th-century religious attire. The decorations on the robe allow viewers to distinguish his attire. The robe lacks dimensional symmetry and proportionality without the decorations. His robe loosely hangs over the armrest.

He is holding a gold ornamented scepter. The scepter creates a foreground and a background for viewers. Behind the scepter a lavish bookshelf is decorated with books from the 16th century. The subject allows viewers a perspective of late 16th century books. The Greek language is written on almost every book. A book leaning against the shelf stands out with the crucifixion scene creating further spatial awareness. The chair is made of wood, it is decorated with Venetian ornaments.

The painter makes exemplary use of lines, circles, and rectangles. At first glance, it would seem that the chair disproportionally connects with the Metropolitan's back but his robe hanging over the armrest clarifies the artist's intentions. The Metropolitan's face and hands exhibit a sense of realism common to Italian Renaissance painting. His beard, nose, eyes, and facial features are painted in detail. Bathas makes exceptional use of sfumato.
