= Vision of the Apocalypse (Bathas) =

Painting by Thomas Bathas

- Όραμα της Αποκάλυψης (Greek), Visione dell'Apocalisse (Italian)
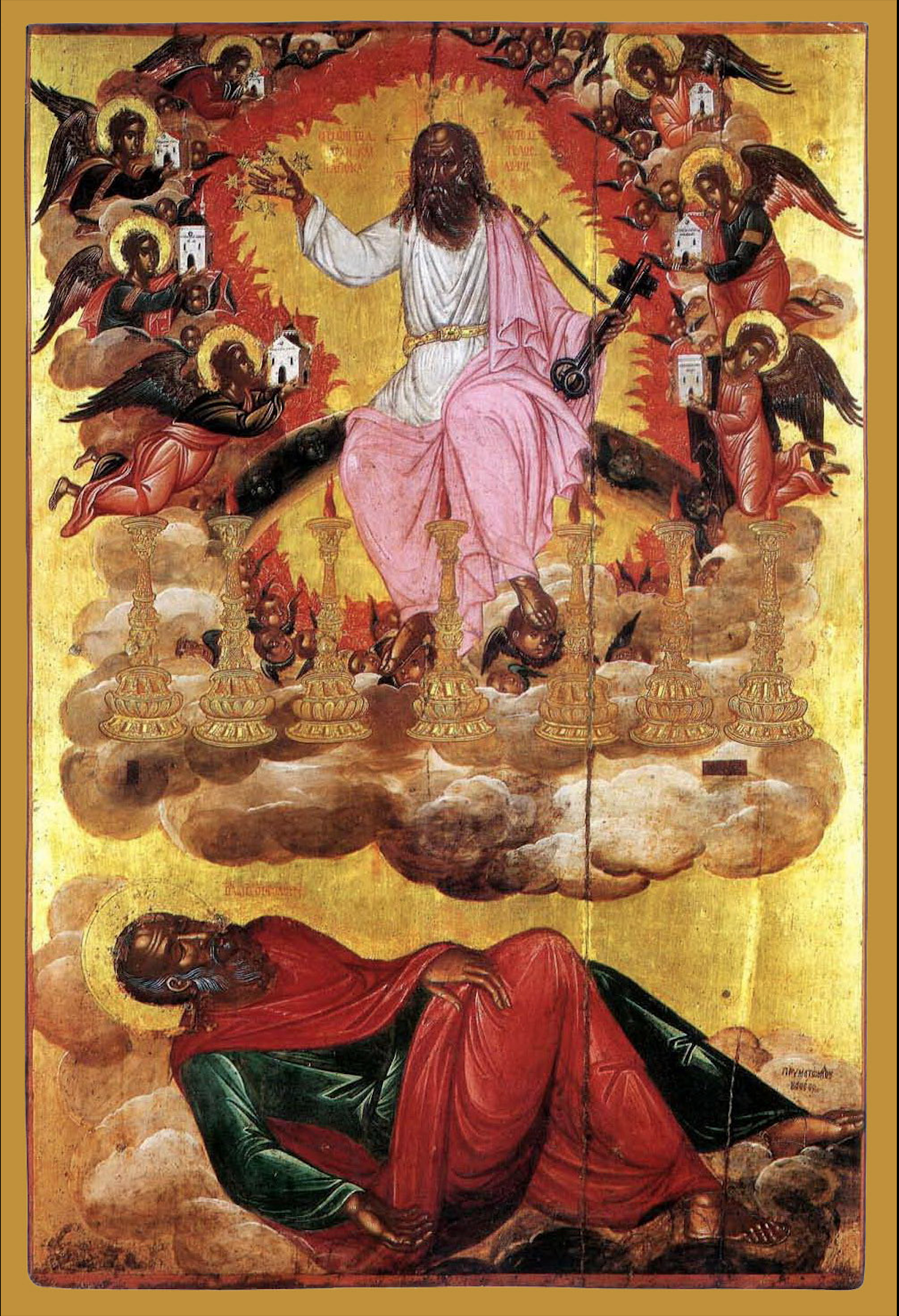
- Artist: Thomas Bathas
- Year: c. 1596
- Medium: tempera on wood
- Movement: Cretan School
- Subject: Revelation of Saint John the Divine
- Dimensions: 170 cm × 116 cm (66.9 in × 45.6 in)
- Location: Cave of the Apocalypse, Patmos, Greece
- Owner: Monastery of Saint John the Theologian, Patmos, Greece

Vision of the Apocalypse, also known as The Revelation of John the Evangelist, is a tempera painting by Thomas Bathas. The massive icon is over four hundred years old. Bathas was from the island of Crete. He was a painter active during the second half of the 16th century. He was active in Heraklion, Venice, and Corfu. He was an important member of the Cretan School. The painting follows the traditional maniera greca. The magnificent icon is on the Greek island of Patmos inside the Cave of the Apocalypse. The mysterious site is believed by Christians to mark the spot where John of Patmos received his visions that he recorded in the Book of Revelation.

== Description ==
The work is a tempera painting with gold leaf on wood. The dimensions are 170 cm (66.9 in) x 116 cm (45.6 in). It is nearly 2 meters (6 feet) in height. It is massive in comparison to other traditional portable icons. At the bottom of the painting John of Patmos is sleeping in a cave. The Apostle is wearing a red and green toga. The painter exhibits a clear definition of lines and folds of fabric. The grooves and curvature of the toga are clearly evident. It is also apparent that he is sleeping on rocks. The rocks show clear definition and form. The apostle is in a cave.

Above the mysterious sleeping apostle, John of Patmos is in a glorious scene depicting his revelation. Seven candles and seven angles represent the seven cities: Ephesus, Smyrna, Pergamon, Thyatira, Sardis, Philadelphia, and Laodicea. Each candlestick is designed with careful detail and attention. They are all made of gold and reminiscent of 16th century Venetian candlesticks. Atop each candle, a torch-like flame represents the holy light.

Each angel holds a building in its grasp depicting each city. The apostle is floating above the world in a spiritual Aura propped up by angles. Thomas Bathas continues to paint the rocks of the cave in the upper portion of the massive panel creating the illusion that the apostle is in a cave. There are seven stars in the apostle's right hand. In his left hand, he holds a set of keys often known as the Keys of Heaven. Saint Peter is often depicted holding the two keys in his left hand. Behind the keys is a sword.

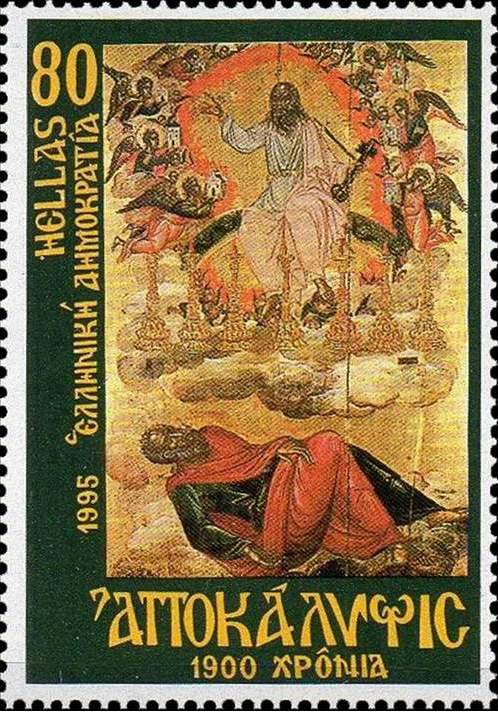
Greek Stamp Vision of the Apocalypse

The gilded background strongly outlines the painted shapes. The figures are formed out of abstract but expressive contours. Thomas Bathas clearly identifies various body parts or items of clothing while creating beautiful patterns. He clearly uses striations to suggest folds of fabric. The bright red, pink, white, and green colors suggest the artist implemented the cangiante style.

The image became popular in the media. It has been featured in countless films, books, newspaper articles, and magazines. It has become an icon representing the book of revelation. In 1995, the Hellenic Republic featured the iconic image on a stamp that circulated throughout the country. It is one of the most common representations of the Revelation of John the Evangelist in the world.

== See also ==
- Michael Prevelis
