= Gabriel Severus =

Greek theologian

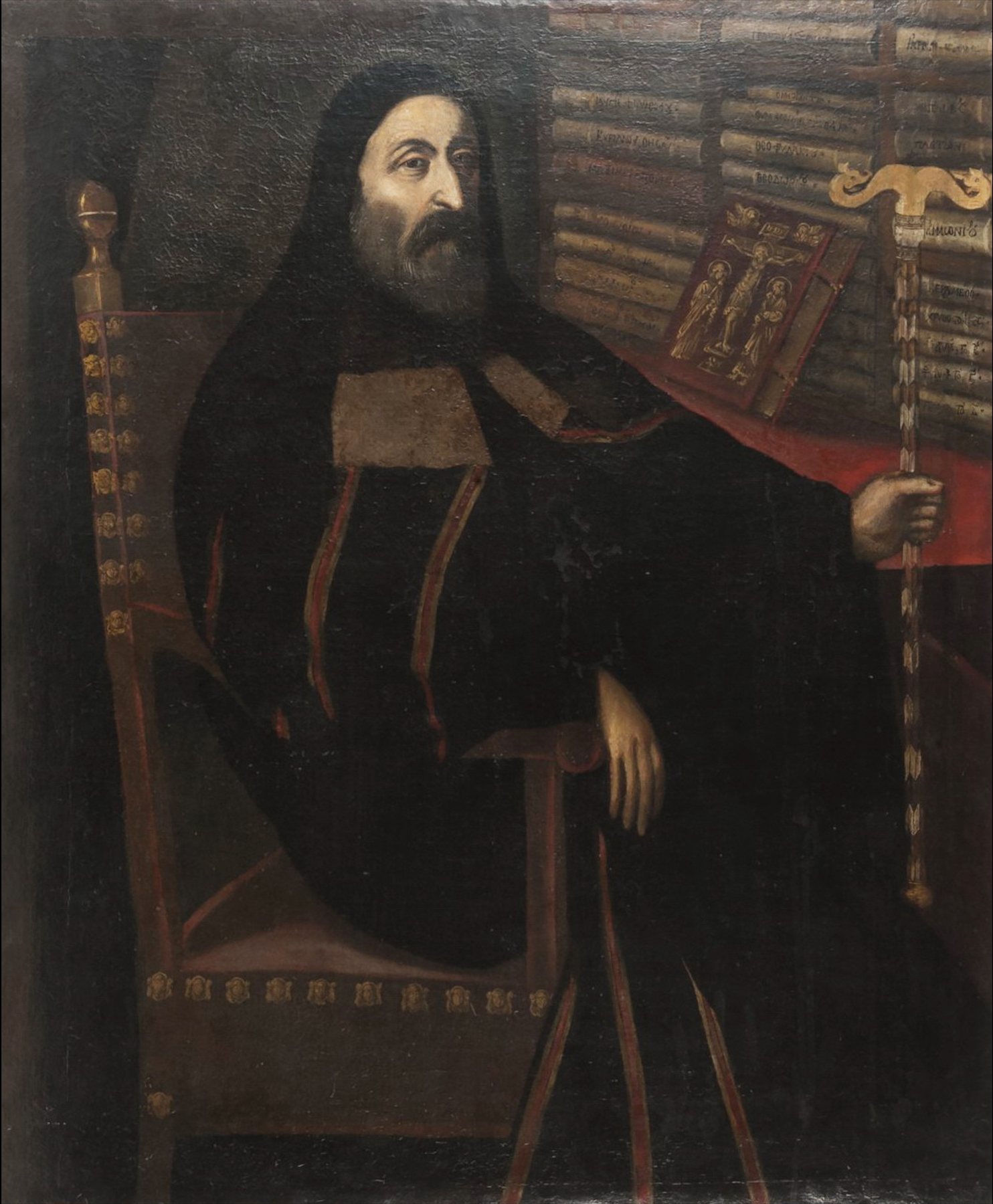
Portrait of Gabriel Severus, contemporary painting by Thomas Bathas

Gabriel Severus or Severos (c. 1540 – 1616) was a Greek Orthodox theologian and prelate active in Venice.

== Life ==
Gabriel's exact date of birth is uncertain. He was born either before 1540 or in 1541. He was a native of Morea, perhaps from Monemvasia. He spent his early life on Venetian Crete. He studied at the University of Padua. In 1572, he moved to Venice. At the time, he was a hieromonk. In 1573 or 1575, he was elected pastor of San Giorgio dei Greci, the church of the Greek community in Venice.

On 18 July 1577, Gabriel was consecrated metropolitan of Philadelphia by Patriarch Jeremiah II. Since the metropolis was under Ottoman rule and its Christian population too few to support him, he remained in Venice to act as the bishop of the Orthodox there. He never visited Philadelphia, but did receive recognition as exarch of the Ecumenical Patriarchate to the Orthodox communities in his charge, namely those of northern Italy, Dalmatia, the Ionian Islands and Crete. He acquired a sizable library, including a copy of a Greek translation of the Summa Theologiae that had belonged to Patriarch Gennadios II.

Gabriel died on 21 October 1616 either in Venice or Hvar in Dalmatia.

== Theology ==
Gabriel readily engaged, sometimes polemically, in defence of Orthodox theology. He advocated the adoption of the Gregorian calendar and the same date of Easter as the Catholic Church. He engaged in polemics with Maximus Margunius concerning the doctrine of the procession of the Holy Spirit and the filioque clause, about which he wrote a tract. At one point, Gabriel accused him of apostasy in front of the patriarch.

Gabriel wrote a tract on the seven sacraments, Syntagmation peri ton hagion kai hieron mysterion (Συνταγμάτιον περὶ τῶν ἁγίων καὶ ἱερῶν μυστερίων), which was printed at Venice in 1600. It is heavily influenced by the scholasticism of Lawrence of Brindisi and defends the doctrine of transsubstantiation. In 1604, he wrote the treatise Kata ton legonton tus orthodoxus [...] kakos te kai paranomos poiein to timan kai proskynein ta hagia dora. In it he defends the Liturgy of Preparation, wherein the Eucharistic elements are venerated during a procession from the prothesis to the altar, arguing that as the elements were dedicated before consecration they were proper objects of veneration from that point.

Gabriel's major work is the Ekthesis (Εκϑεσις). This was written sometime after 1591. It was directed against two leading Jesuits, Antonio Possevino and Robert Bellarmine. Following the Council of Florence, he identifies five fundamental doctrinal differences between Orthodox and Catholic churches. The doctrines in question are the double procession of the Holy Spirit, Petrine primacy, the use of unleavened bread in the Eucharist, Purgatory and the state of the saved prior to the Last Judgement.

Gabriel's theology was largely unoriginal, but it was occasionally appropriated by Protestants for use against Catholics. Gabriel himself corresponded with several Protestants, including Martin Crusius. A selection of his writings was translated from Greek into Latin by Richard Simon as Fides Ecclesiae Orientalis seu Gabrielis Metropolitae Philadelphiensis Opuscula and printed at Paris in 1671.
