= Nicopeia =

Title and icon of the Virgin Mary in Byzantine art

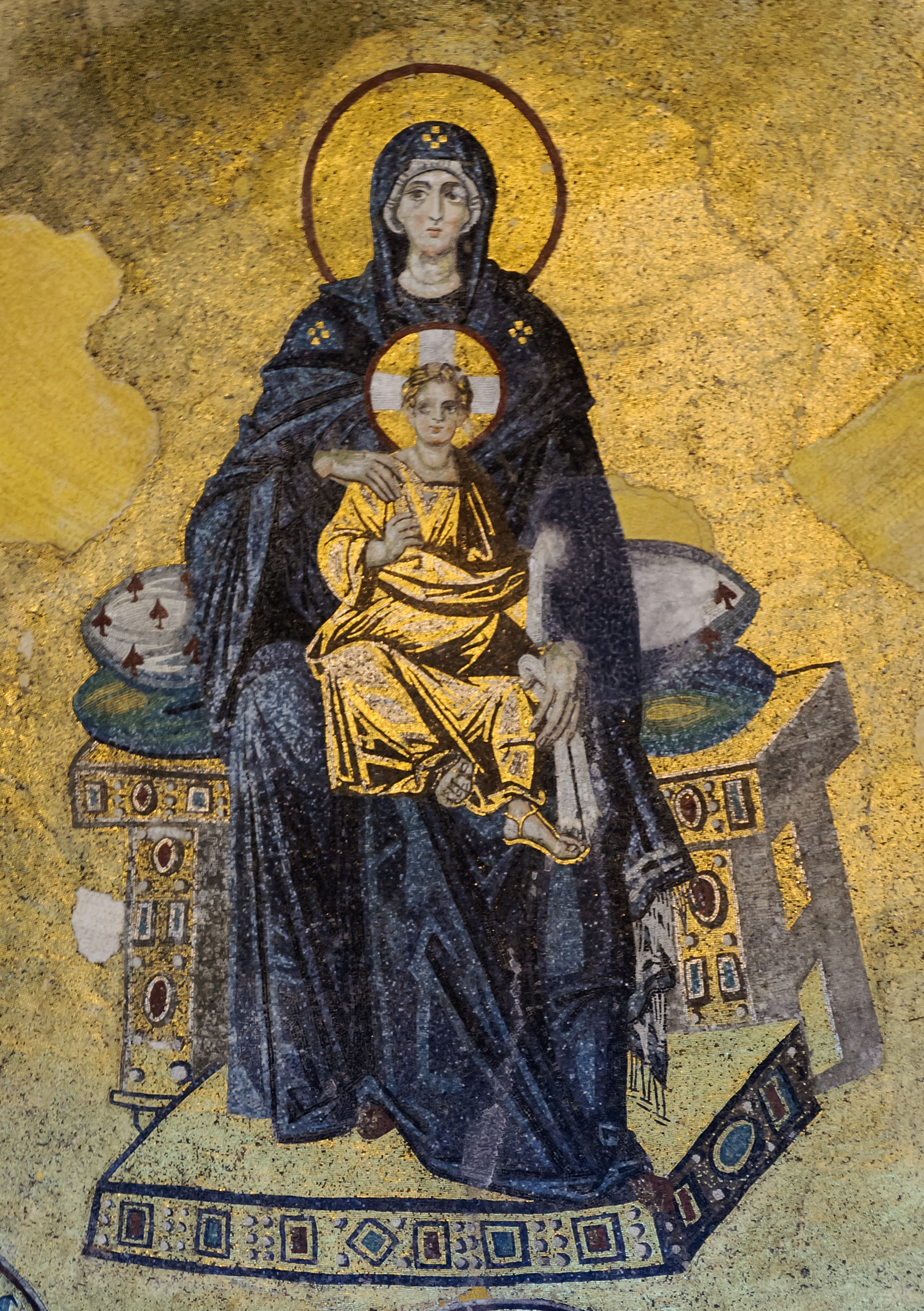
Example in Hagia Sophia, Istanbul.

Nicopeia (sometimes transliterated Nikopoia, Nikopea or Nikopeia; literally 'bringer of victory', from Greek: Νικοποιός) is a title of the Virgin Mary and a type of icon in Byzantine art showing Mary frontally, seated on a throne and holding the Christ Child in her arms. A conceptually similar idea in the Western Church is Our Lady of Victory. It is similar to the Theotokos Kyriotissa (enthroned Madonna) and the Tuscan 'Maestà'.

The title derives from the belief that Mary would defeat Byzantium's enemies. The type was considered as the protector of the state and of the army and was similarly honoured to the Hodegetria. It was carried as a banner and hung at the gates of Constantinople.

From the 6th century onwards the type appears on Byzantine seals and Byzantine coins, replacing the pagan goddess Nike and even adapting the goddess' shield into a medallion or imago clipeata bearing an image of Christ granting victory. Later the type appears on coins of Michael VII Doukas and Nikephoros Botaneiates and later still in frescoes in Cappadocia, Tutenisa, Serbia and Russia. Possibly imitating an example in Hagia Sophia, the Venetians placed a similar image in St Mark's Basilica.

== See also ==
- Virgin Nikopoios
