= Virgin Nikopoios =

Painting by Thomas Bathas

- Παναγία η Νικοποιός (Greek)
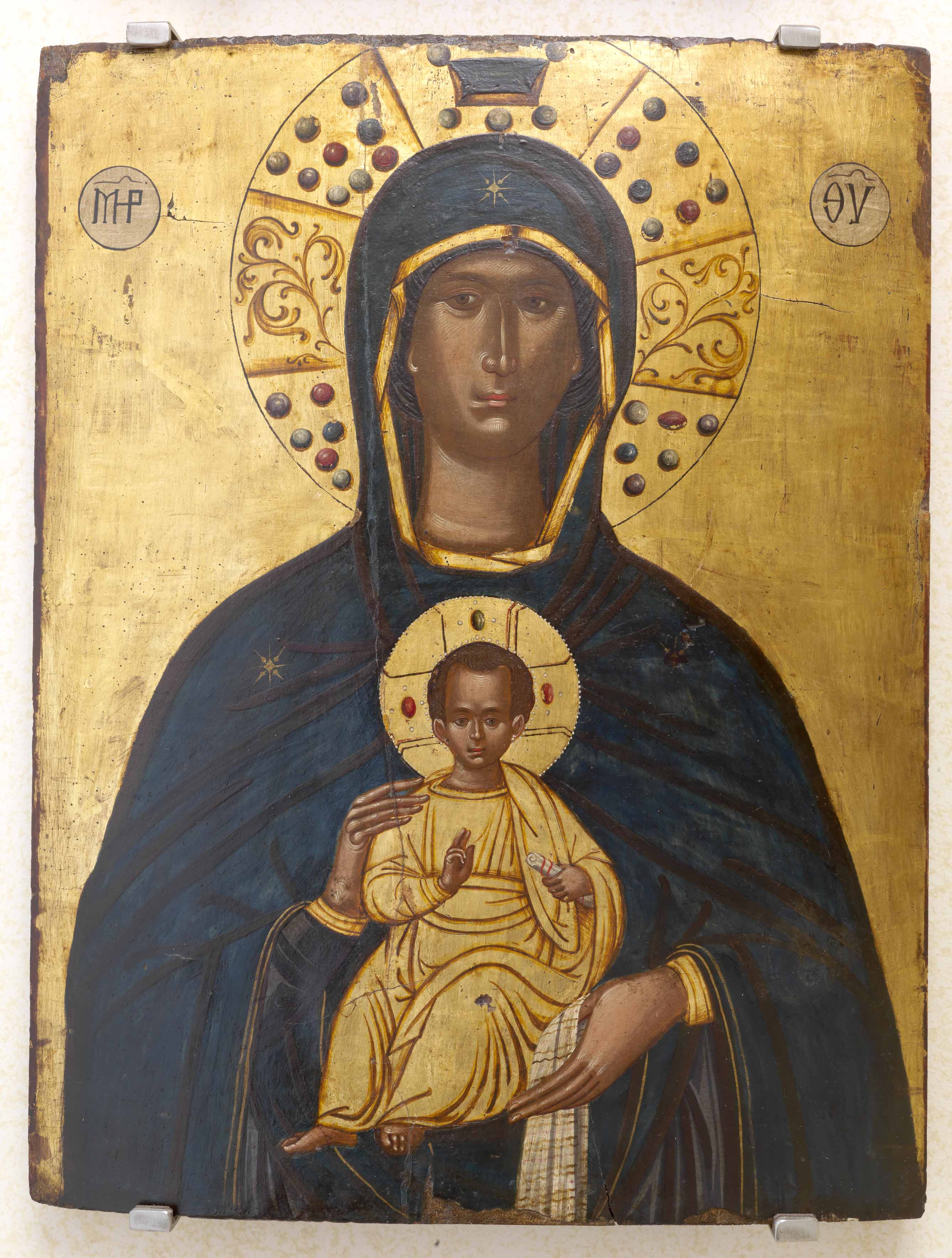
- Artist: Thomas Bathas
- Year: c. 1594
- Medium: tempera on wood
- Movement: Cretan School
- Subject: Virgin and Child
- Dimensions: 53 cm × 41.2 cm (20.9 in × 16.2 in)
- Location: Hellenic Institute of Byzantine and Post-Byzantine Studies in Venice, Venice, Italy
- Owner: Hellenic Institute of Byzantine and Post-Byzantine Studies

The Virgin Nikopoios also known as Panagia Nikopoios is a tempera painting by Thomas Bathas. Bathas was active in Heraklion, Venice, and Corfu during the second half of the 16th century. The painting follows the traditional Byzantine style characteristic of the traditional maniera greca. The painting also featured the Venetian style. The position of the Virgin and Child is the Nikopoios (the bringer of victory). The word Nicopeia is indicative of Constantinople. There are actually many different types.

The name "bringer of the victory" has been associated with this position and style after 7th century Byzantine Emperor Heraclius choose the image of the Theotokos and Child and made them his protectors when he sailed from Carthage to Constantinople in 610 AD. Byzantine Emperor Heraclius left the image in Constantinople after the victory. According to legend, the siege of the Avaren and Slaves was averted in 626, after praying to the image. Another legend states that Empress Eudokia gave the icon to her sister in sister-in-law Empress Pulcheria in the 400s.

The original was part of Venetian loot when Constantinople was sacked in 1204 during the fourth Crusade. The Madonna Nicopeia became part of the collection of St Mark's Basilica. Ironically, Thomas Bathas maintained some of the paintings at the Basilica. The Virgin Nicopeia was definitely inspired by the Madonna Nicopeia at St Mark's Basilica.

== Description ==
The painting is egg tempera and gold leaf on wood. The dimensions are 53 cm x 41.2 cm or 20.9 in x 16.2 in, it was completed in 1594 in Venice. The icon features the Virgin holding the infant Jesus. The Virgin Mary is depicted as half-body and frontal, holding Christ with both hands in front of her chest, and on the axis of her body. The halo is decorated with precious stones. Her cloak is dark in contrast to the shining garments of Christ. The infant’s halo features three precious stones denoting the father, son, and holy spirit. Two of the stones are the same. There is a scroll in the infant's left hand. The scroll in his hand has many interpretations. Some call it the scroll of wisdom, it symbolizes the word of god or indicates that Jesus is the living word of God. It can also denote the new testament. The Virgin holds his baby blanket.

The position of the Madonna and Child is the traditional Our Lady of the Sign also known as Platitera and in Italian Nostra Signora del Segno. The position is also referred to as the Nikopoios. This is very different from the Madonna and Child Hodegetria (Our Lady of the Way) in Italian La Madonna Odigitria. Another term commonly used is the Glykophilousa (Virgin of the Sweet Kiss), Eleusa Virgin (Virgin of Compassion), and Pelagonitissa (Playing child) are interchanged. Although the subject is similar among the artists of the style each specific painting has its own character and identity.

== Gallery ==
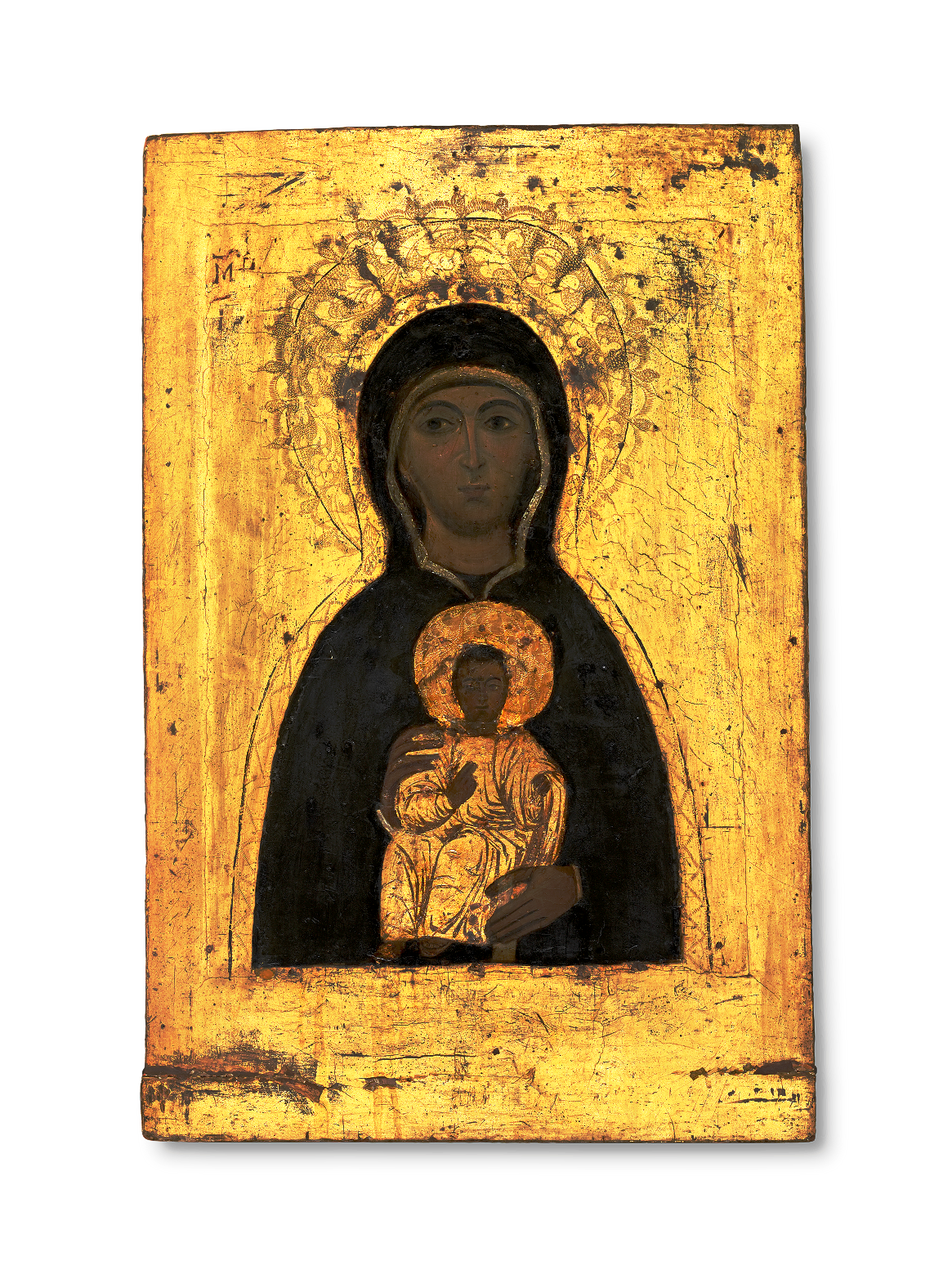
Nicopeia Virgin & Child 1120

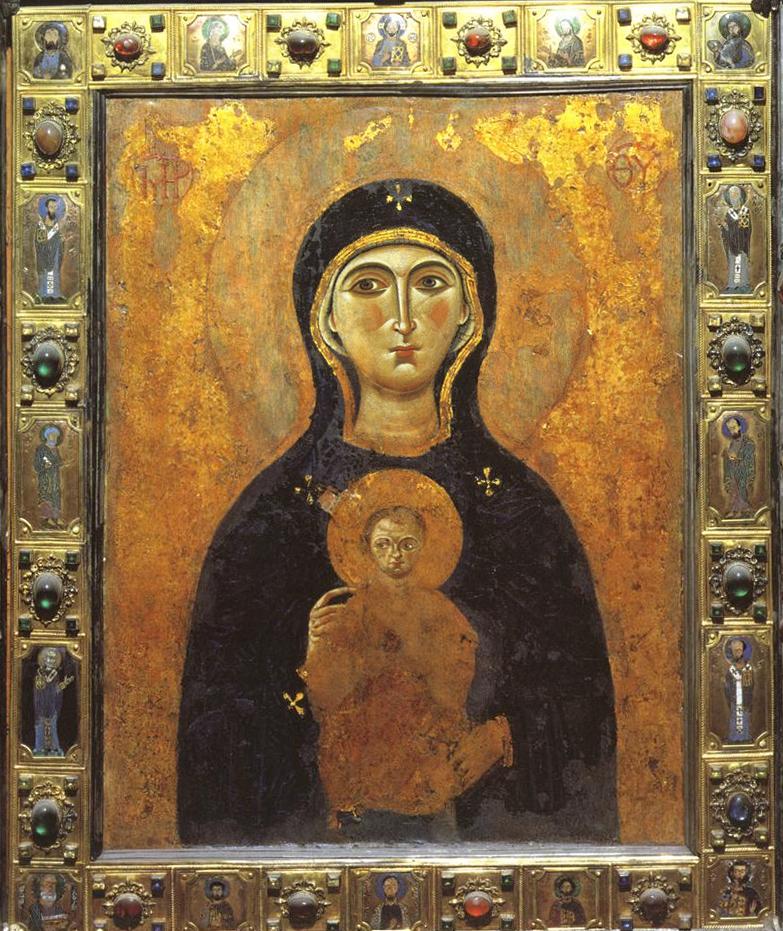
Madonna Nicopeia San Marco
