= Thomas Bathas =

Greek painter (1554–1599)

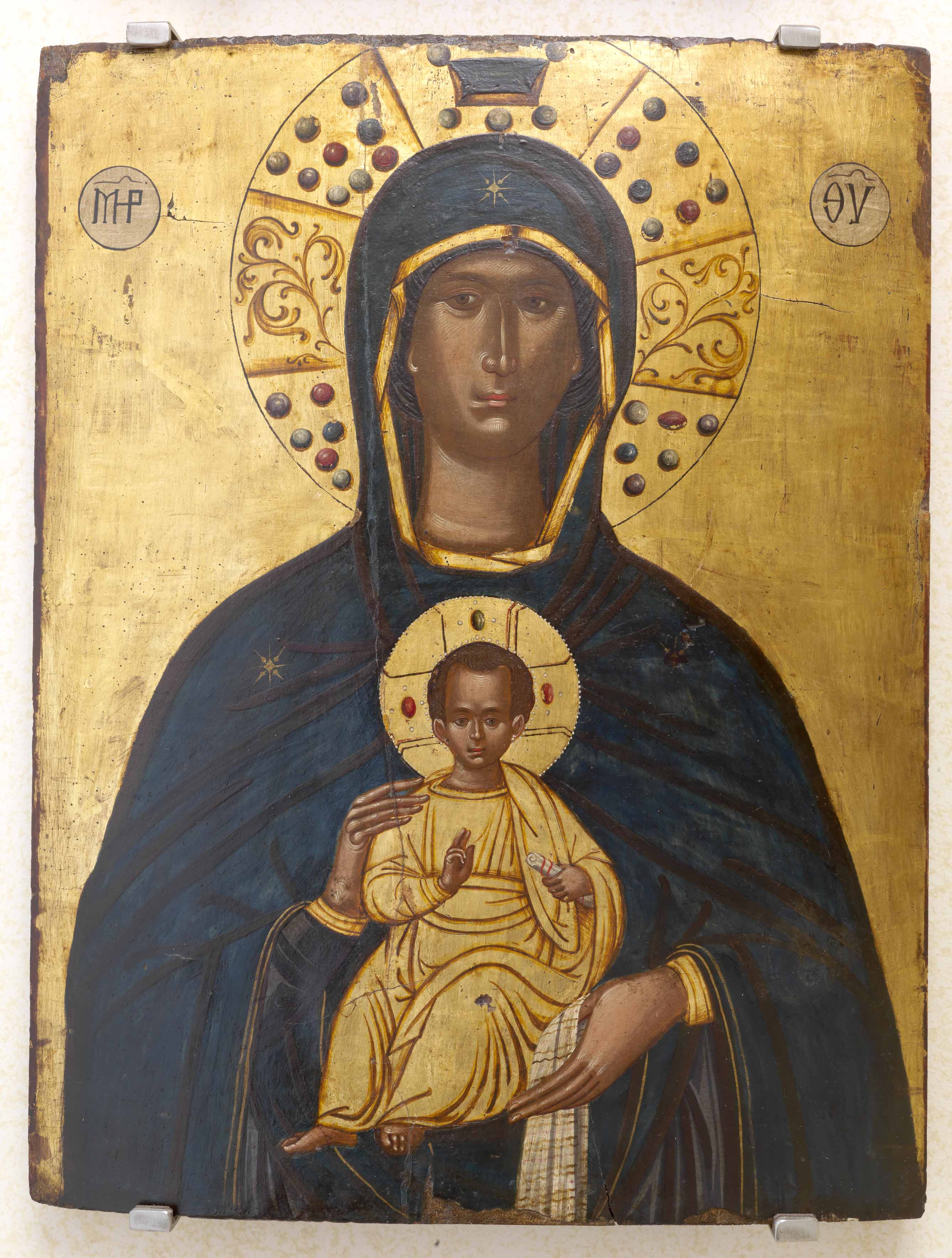
- Icon of the Virgin and Child
- Born: 1554; Heraklion, Republic of Venice
- Died: 1599 (aged 44–45); Venice, Republic of Venice
- Known for: Painting
- Movement: Cretan school

Thomas Bathas (Greek: Θωμάς Μπαθάς, 1554–1599; also known as Tomios or Tomio, Batta Tornio) was a Greek painter, educator, and Vikar. He employed the maniera greca in some of his work but he also broke from tradition by employing the Venetian style. He traveled around the Venetian Empire going from Heraklion to Corfu and Venice. He was a prominent member of the Greek Confraternity in Venice. He was friends with Gabriel Severus, Metropolitan of Philadelphia. He was very popular among both Greek and Italian patrons. He influenced the works of countless artists both Italian and Greek. Some of his works are in San Giorgio dei Greci and the Hellenic Institute of Venice. Emmanuel Tzanes, Konstantinos Tzanes, Ioannis Moskos, and Philotheos Skoufos were some Greek artists influenced by his work. One of his students was the famous painter Emmanuel Tzanfournaris. He left him a fortune in his will.

His most famous works include: Portrait of Gabriel Severus and Virgin and Child Enthroned. Twenty of his paintings have survived.

== History ==
Thomas Bathas was born in Heraklion. His father's name was Nicholas. Thomas may have been related to Marko Bathas. Thomas was married. In the Venetian archives he is listed as ό Tornio da Nicolo da Corfu Batta. He first appears in Venice around 1581. He was twenty-seven years old. He appears in Venice on-off until 1598. For a short period, he traveled to Corfu where he maintained an active painting workshop between 1585-1587. He signed a contract to teach Angelo Kritopoulos's son Iakovo painting for three years. He is also listed in a contract as a witness on January 31, 1586, it was written at the monastery della Gloriosa a nostra Donna Nuntiata in Corfu. He signed it as miser Tornio Batha de Candia depentor.

One year later, he updated his contract with Iakovo Kritopoulos's father. He agreed to pay Thomas in money or products but he would send it to Venice. Thomas was Iakovo's teacher until December, 1587. On July 23, 1588, the painter was living in Venice where he would remain for the rest of his life. He made an application to run for Vikar but lost the election. He was elected in the years 1592, 1595, and 1598. In 1594, he was hired to maintain the Miraculous Icon of the Virgin Mary at St Mark's Basilica. On December 11, 1589, he made out a will.

He lived in San Antonin. According to his will, he had a close relationship with Gabriel Severus, Metropolitan of Philadelphia. He bequeathed him a silver cup. He also made Severus the executor of the will. He also mentioned his other student Frangkiskos in the will. It stipulated that he must continue painting to receive the gift. The will clarifies his massive fortune before he was a painter.

There was a competition to complete a Mosaic of Christ in the niche of the sanctuary of San Giorgio dei Greci. The other participants were famous Italian painter Palma il Giovane, Ioannis Vlastos, and Bunialetto. Thomas won the competition because his art conformed to the desired maniera greca. The requirements of the Greek Brotherhood were the old ways (uso antico) and the pious Greek-style (alla divota maniera greca). On September 3, 1598, the Greek Brotherhood approved the design.

The archives indicate the payment on April 1, 1599, he is mentioned as mistro Tornio Batha. Two weeks later on April 11, 1599, the painter made out a second will. In the second will, he left a sizable fortune to his wife. He also left a fortune to his student Emmanuel Tzanfournaris. His will wrote tutti i miei desegni cosi grechi, come all italiana, which translates to "all my designs so Greek, as well as Italian." The artist died two days later on April 13, 1599 in Venice. He was forty-five years old.

== Gallery ==
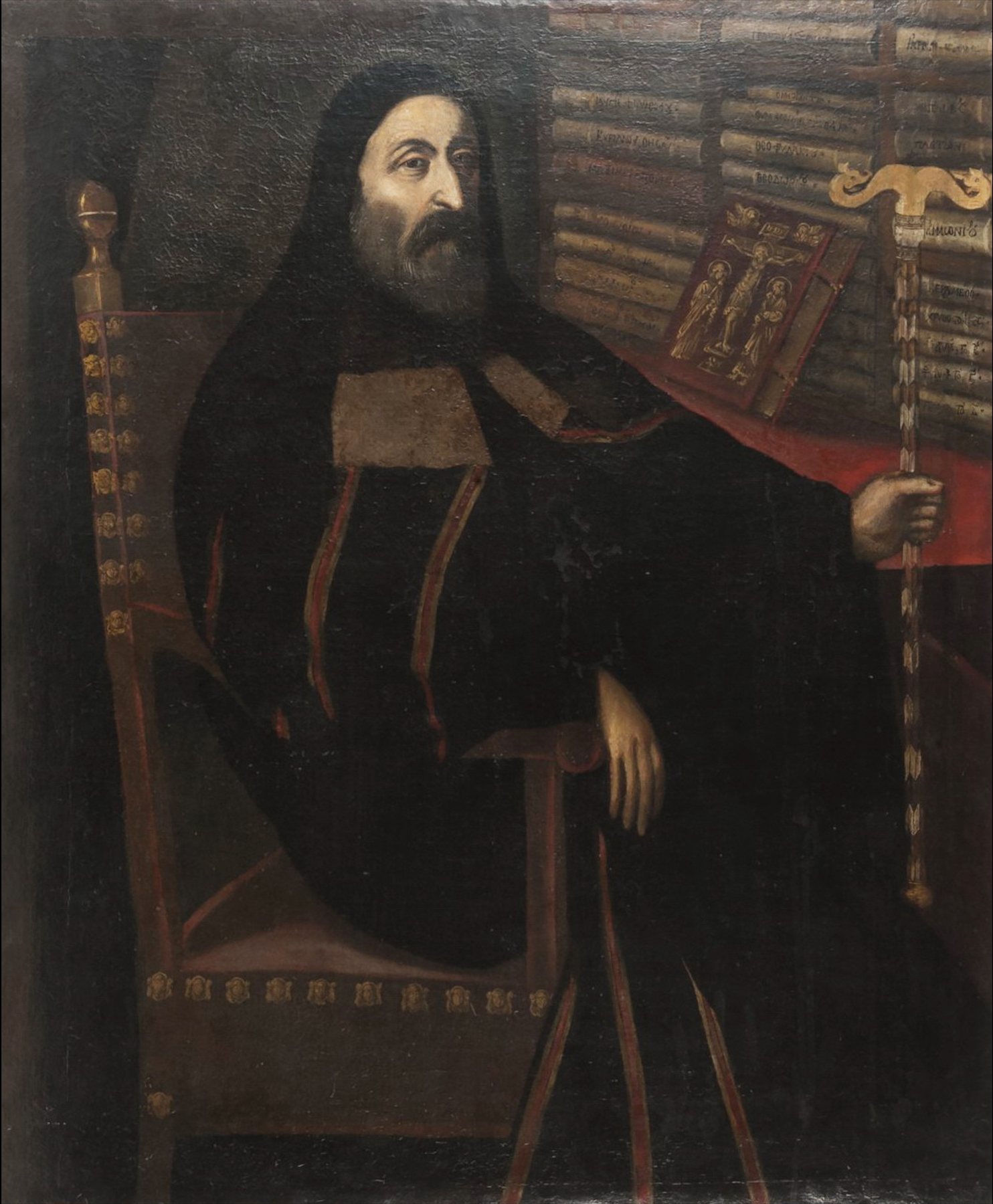
Portrait of Gabriel Severus

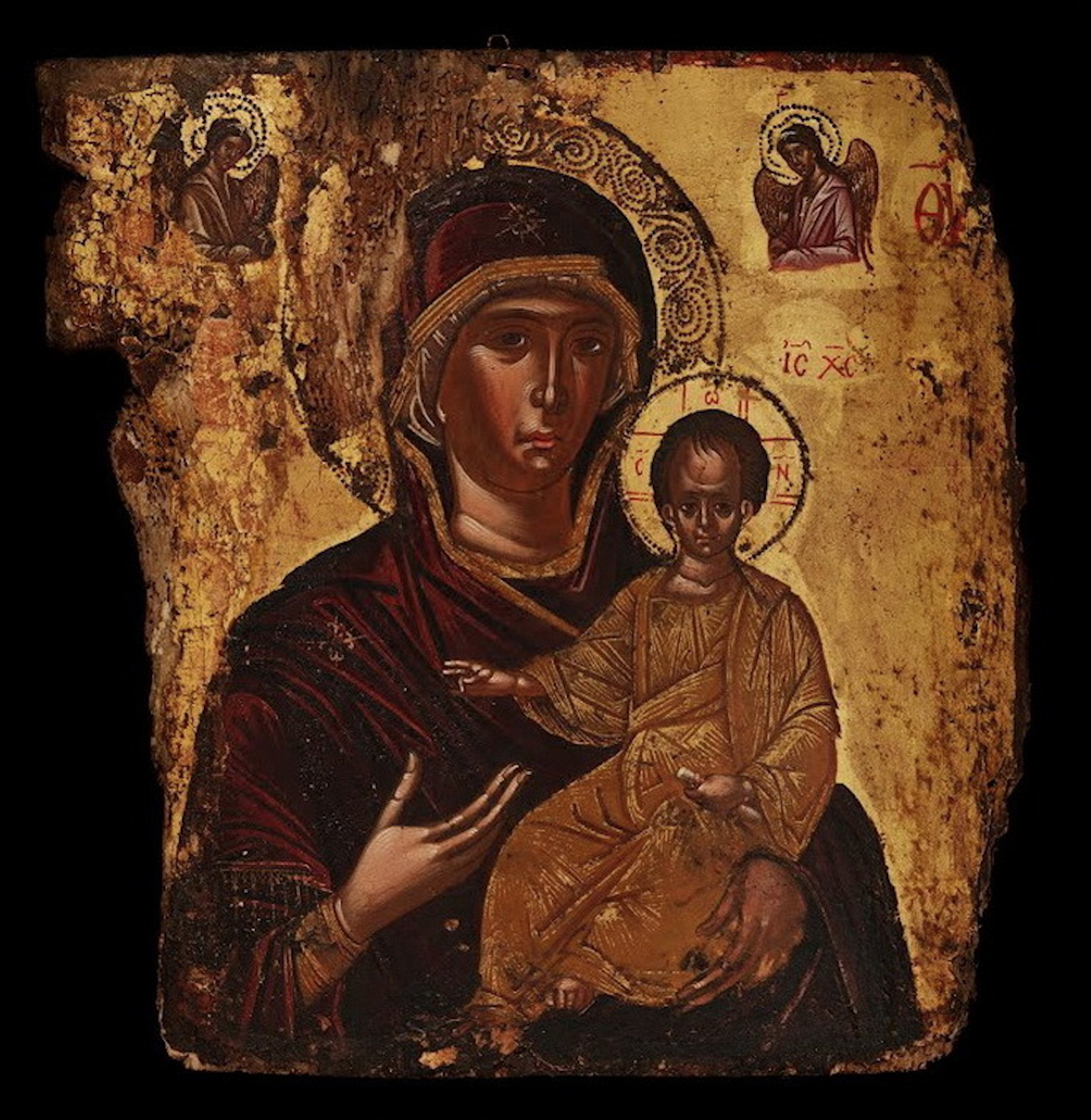
Virgin and Child, Hodegetria

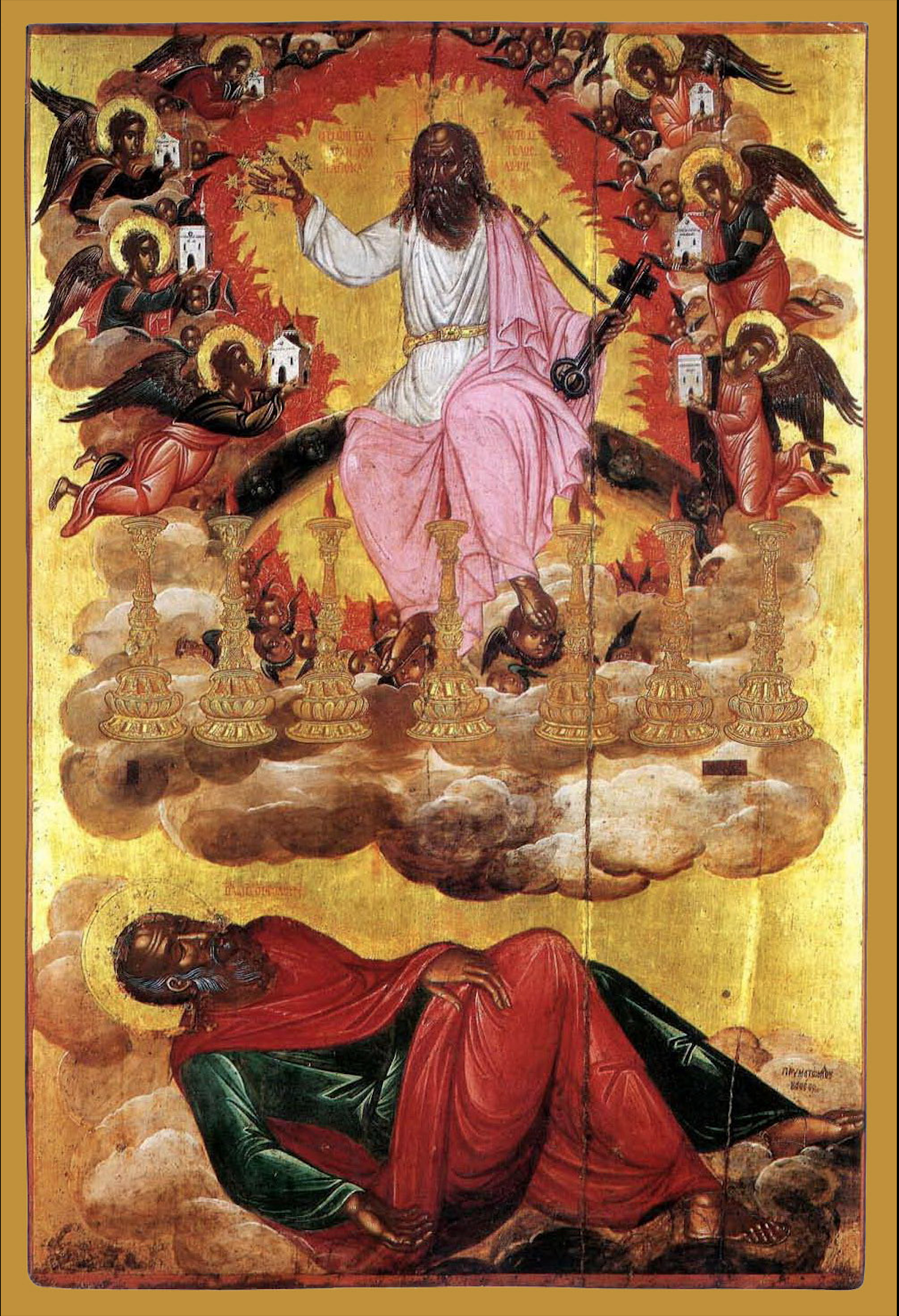
Revelation of Saint John the Divine

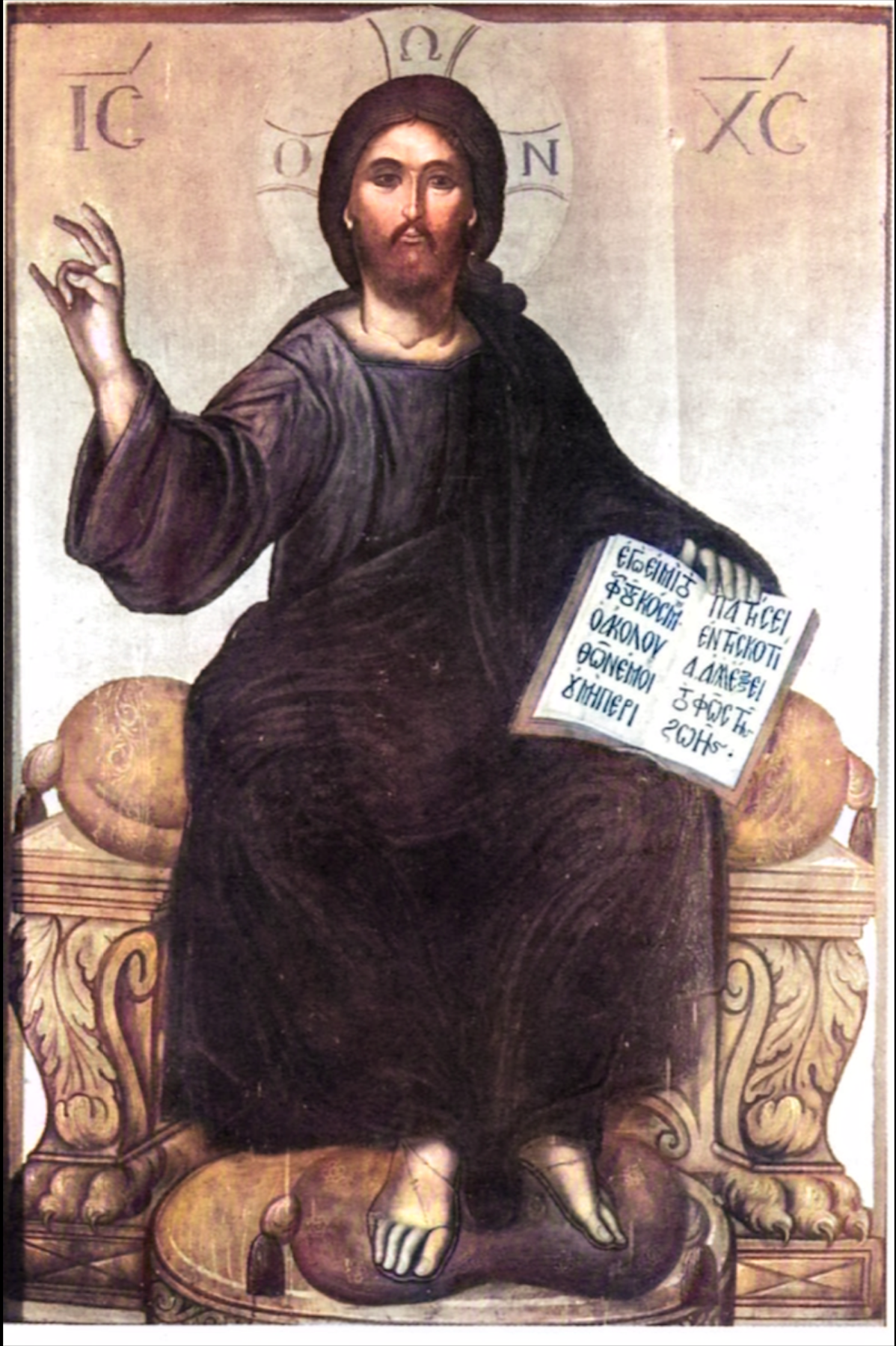
Jesus Enthroned for San Giorgio dei Greci Competition

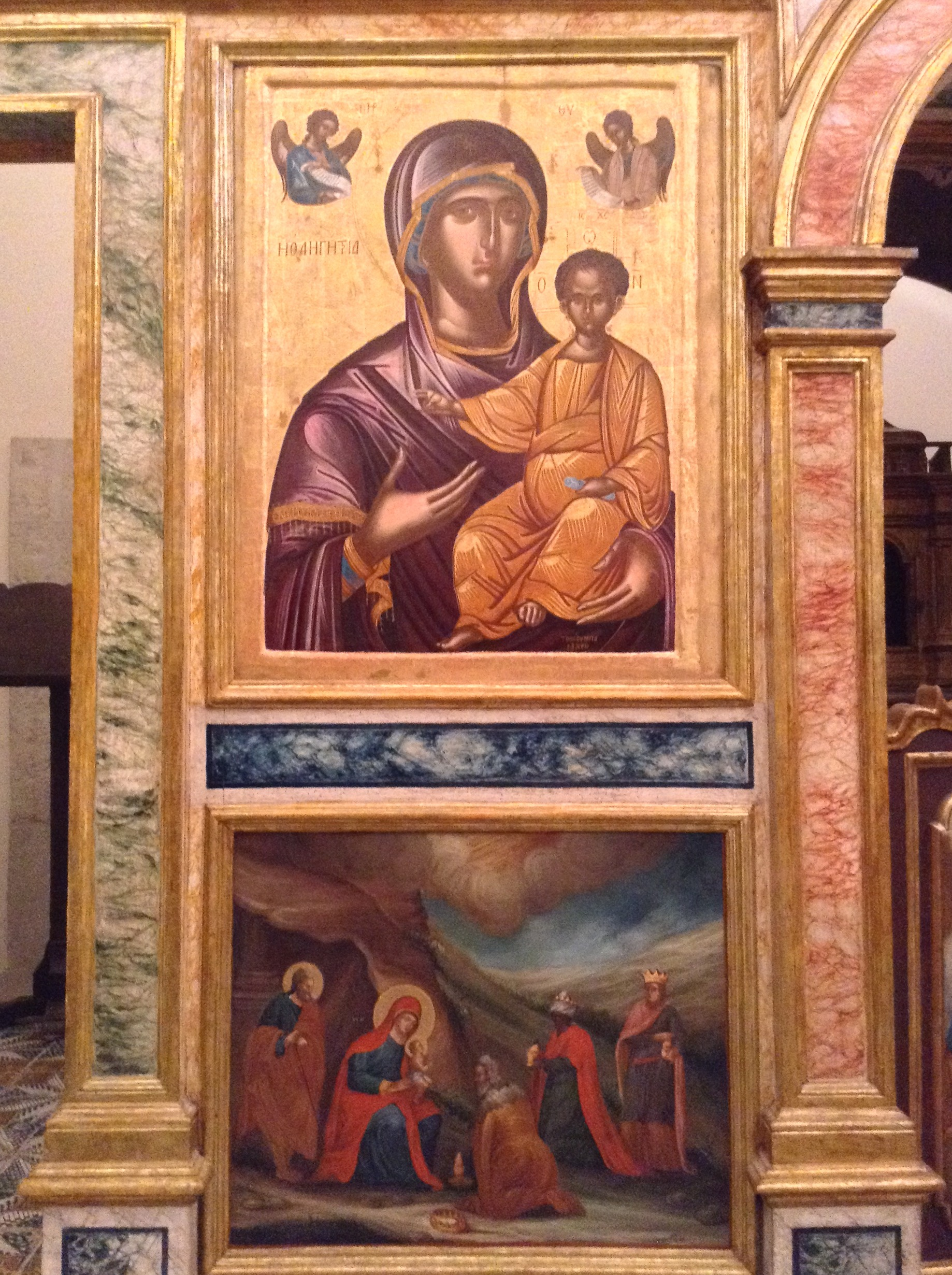
Virgin and Child

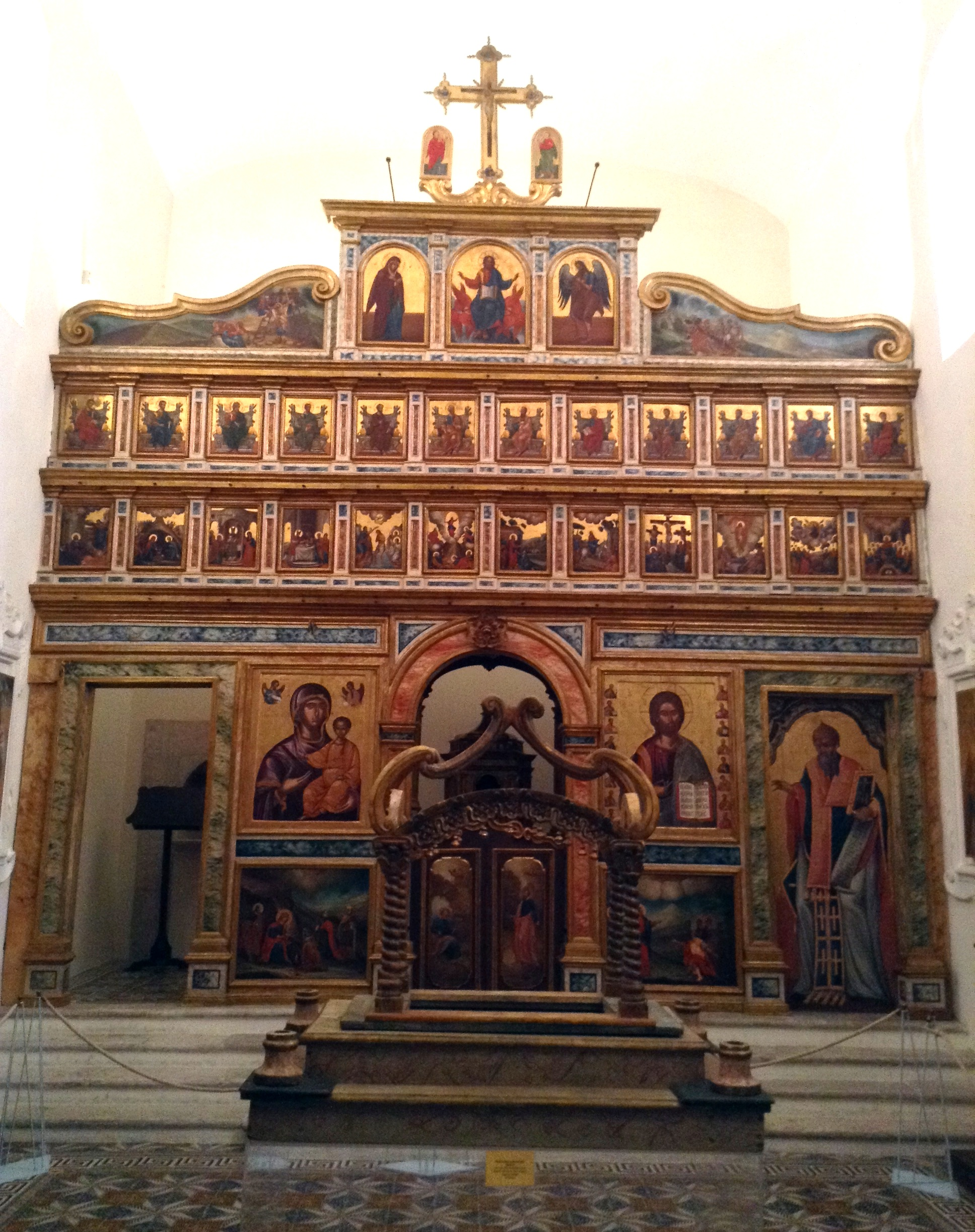
Bathas Virgin and Child Left and Jesus Right

== Notable works ==
- Vision of the Apocalypse (Bathas)
- Portrait of Gabriel Severus
- Virgin Nikopoios
- Jesus Enthroned Greek Church Santa Maria Degli Angeli Barletta Bari, Italy
- Virgin and Child Greek Church Santa Maria Degli Angeli Barletta Bari, Italy

== Bibliography ==
- Hatzidakis, Manolis; Drakopoulou, Evgenia (1997). Έλληνες Ζωγράφοι μετά την Άλωση (1450-1830). Τόμος 2: Καβαλλάρος - Ψαθόπουλος [Greek Painters after the Fall of Constantinople (1450-1830). Volume 2: Kavallaros - Psathopoulos]. Athens: Center for Modern Greek Studies, National Research Foundation. hdl:10442/14088. ISBN 960-7916-00-X.
