= Emmanuel Tzanfournaris =

Greek painter (1570–1630)

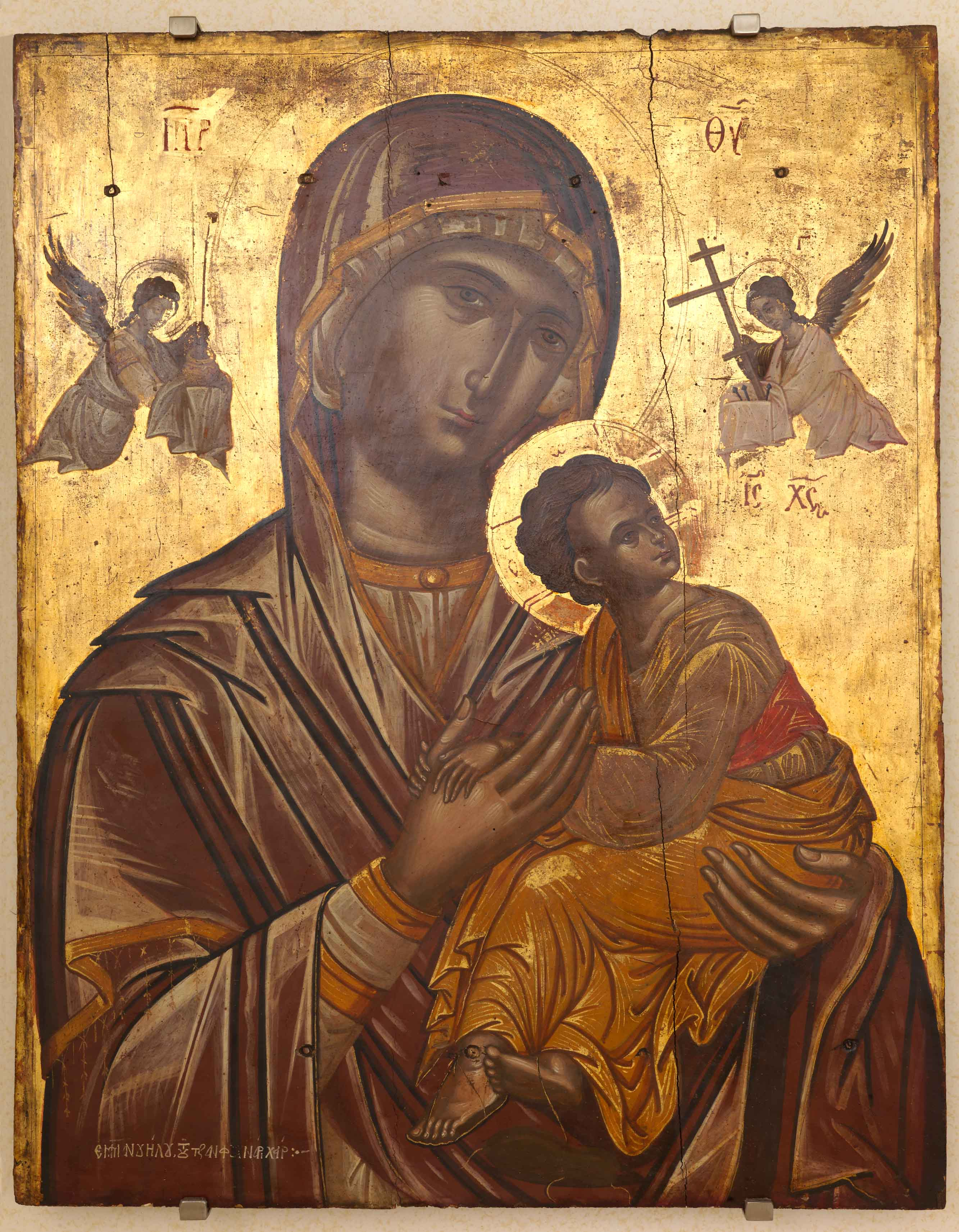
- Virgin of the Passion
- Born: 1570; Corfu, Republic of Venice
- Died: 1631 (aged 60–61); Venice, Republic of Venice
- Education: Apprentice to Thomas Bathas
- Known for: Iconography and hagiography
- Movement: Cretan school
- Spouse: Eleni Soderini
- Children: Theofilakto; Thomas; Andrew; Roza

Emmanuel Tzanfournaris (Greek: Εμμανουήλ Τζανφουρνάρης; 1570–1630), also known as Emmanouil Manos, was a Greek painter. He was a painter in Corfu and Venice. He was taught by famous painter Thomas Bathas. Emmanuel's father Georgios was also a famous painter. Emmanuel was active within the Greek Community of Venice until 1625. Some of his paintings are in the church of San Giorgio dei Greci. He was influenced by Michael Damaskinos and other Venetian painters. Tzanfournaris adopted the Venetian school but also stayed loyal to the maniera greca. He influenced the works of countless painters namely Emmanuel Tzanes, Franghias Kavertzas, Philotheos Skoufos and his son Theofilakto Tzanfournaris. Tzanfournaris artwork can be found all over the world. Sixteen of his paintings have survived.

== History ==
Emmanuel was born in Corfu. His father was Georgios Tzanfournaris. He was a famous painter. His father painted the church Pantokratoras in the town of Zigos in Corfu. Emmanuel's teacher was the famous Cretan painter Thomas Bathas. Around 29 years of age Emmanuel moved to Venice. He stayed in Venice for twenty-eight years. While in Venice he married Eleni Soderini in 1605. They had four children. Theofilakto, Thomas, Andrew, and Roza. Theofilakto was a priest and a painter. His brother Thomas became a lawyer. Emmanuel's signature is present within the Greek community from 1611-1629. In 1623 he was elected Vicar. He was the representative of a bishop. By 1625, someone else was elected Vicar. He also paid his dues as a member of the Greek Community every year. He died at 61 years old in 1631. In Venetian public records, he is known as Manuel Zanfornari da Corfou.

Some of his icons can be found in the Greek church in Venice San Giorgio dei Greci. His son inherited two of his icons. A will executed on February 14, 1651, in Venice outlined Theofilakto as the receiver of two paintings. The Kimisis of Saint Spyridon and the Feast of Orthodoxy. On March 1, 1658, Theofilakto gave the icons to the Greek Church in Venice San Giorgio dei Greci. Tzanfournaris became an extremely popular painter. His signature was forged as was the case with many popular artists. His style evolved. His early works exhibited the traditional Cretan School while his later works evolved because of his exposure to the art of Venice. Many artists were influenced by Tzanfournaris namely: Emmanuel Tzanes and Franghias Kavertzas. Emmanuel Tzanes was the priest of San Giorgio dei Greci. Philotheos Skoufos was also briefly in Venice.

== Gallery ==
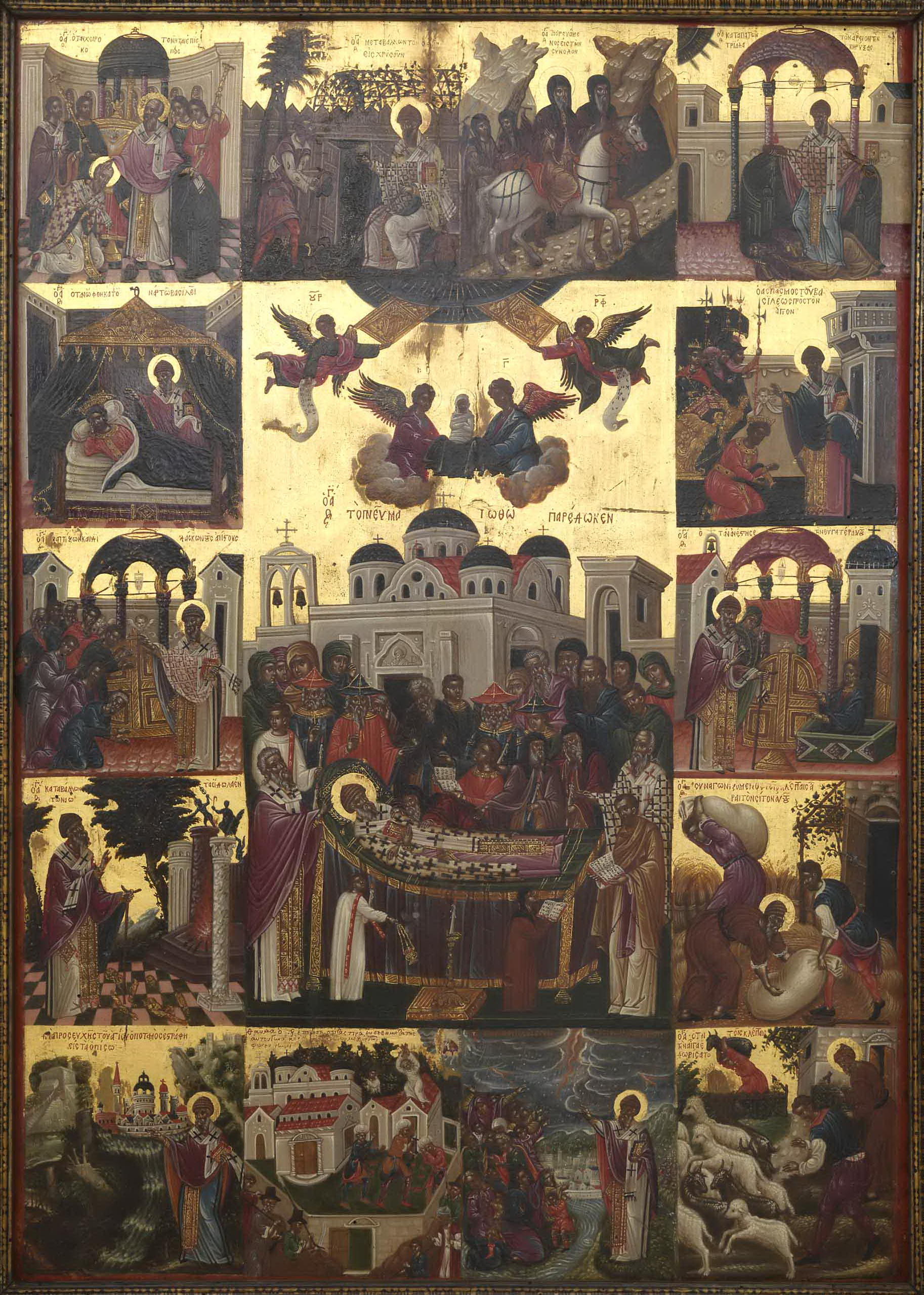
Assumption of St. Spyridon 1595

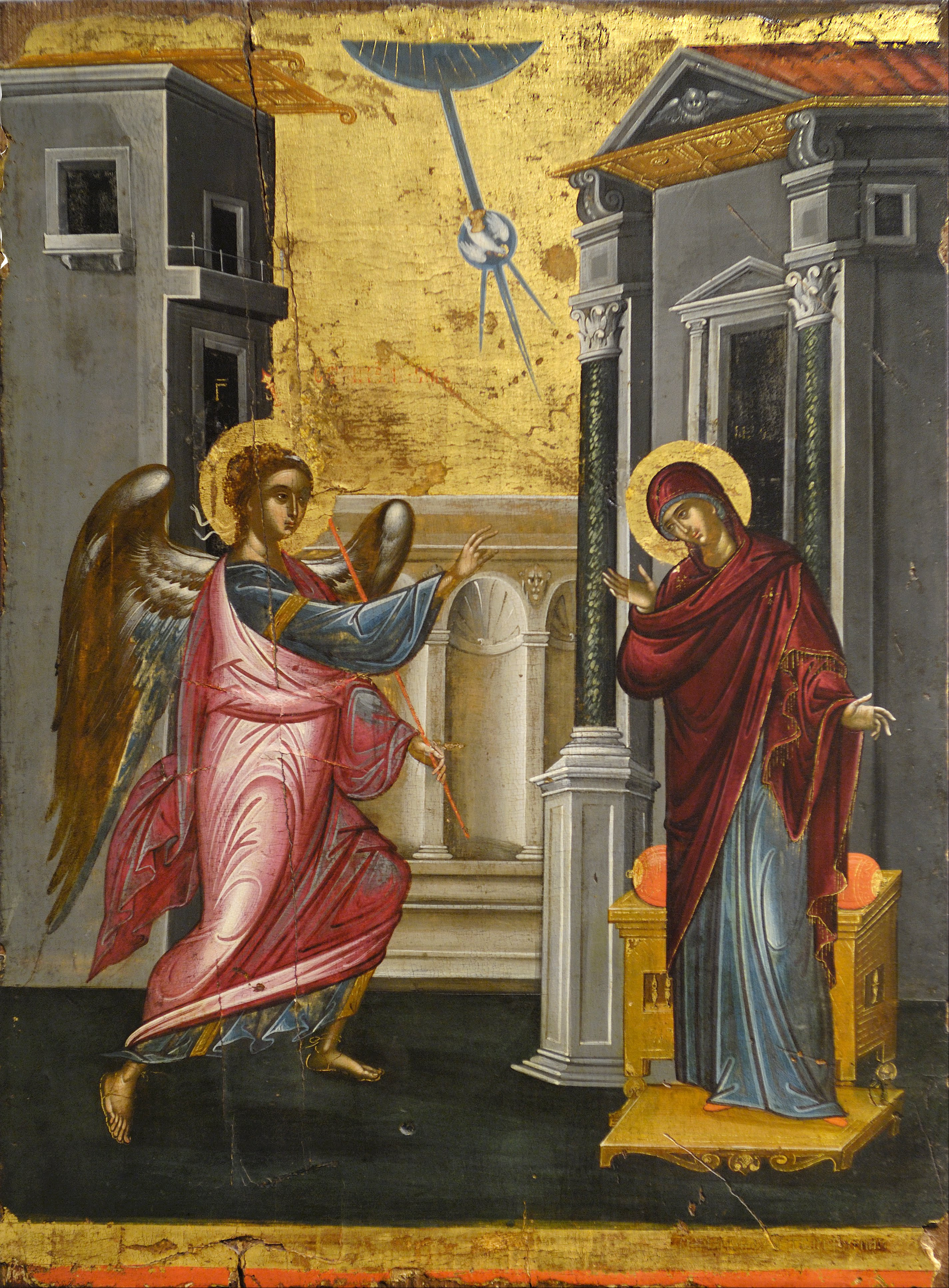
The Annunciation

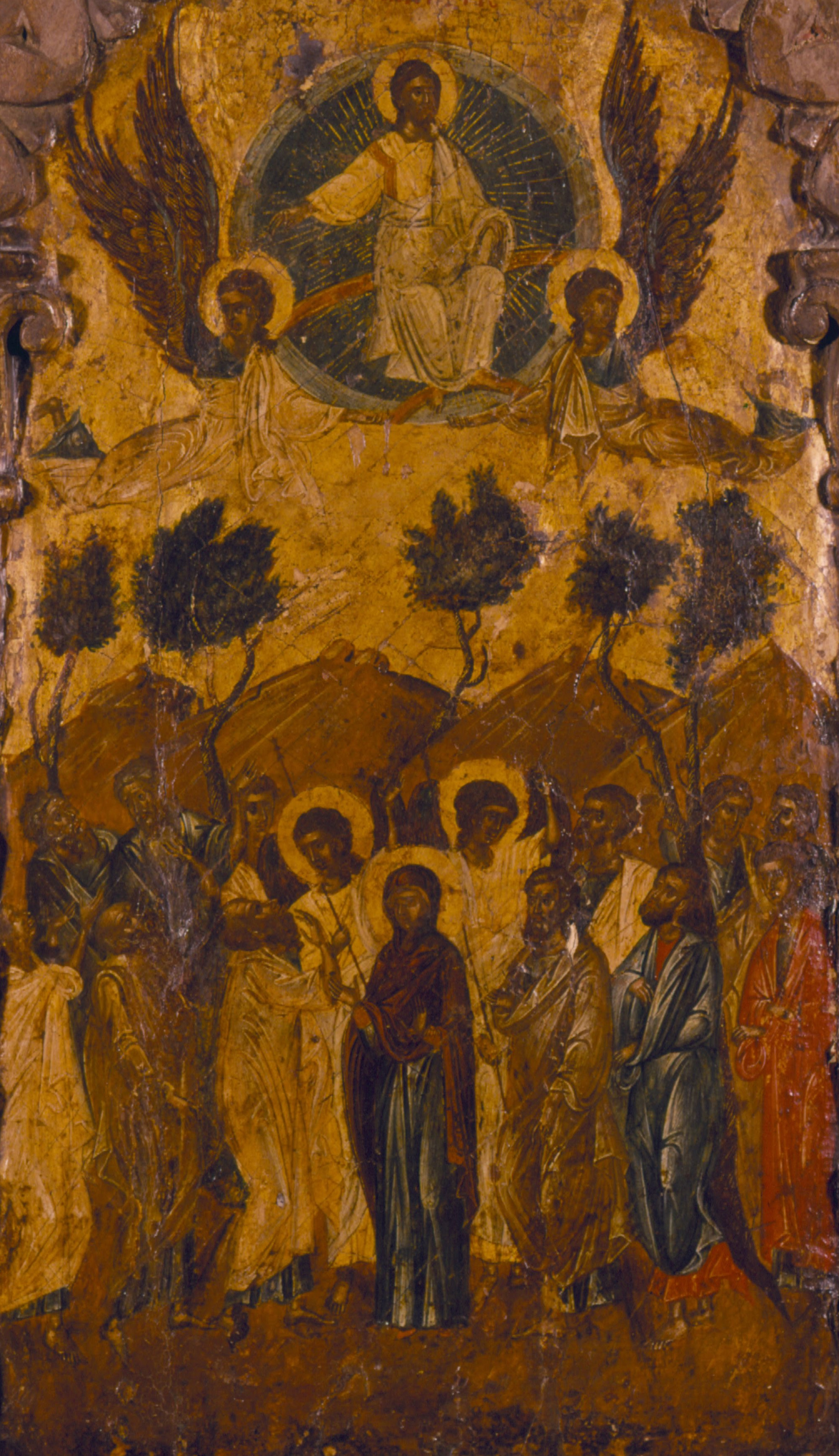
The Ascension

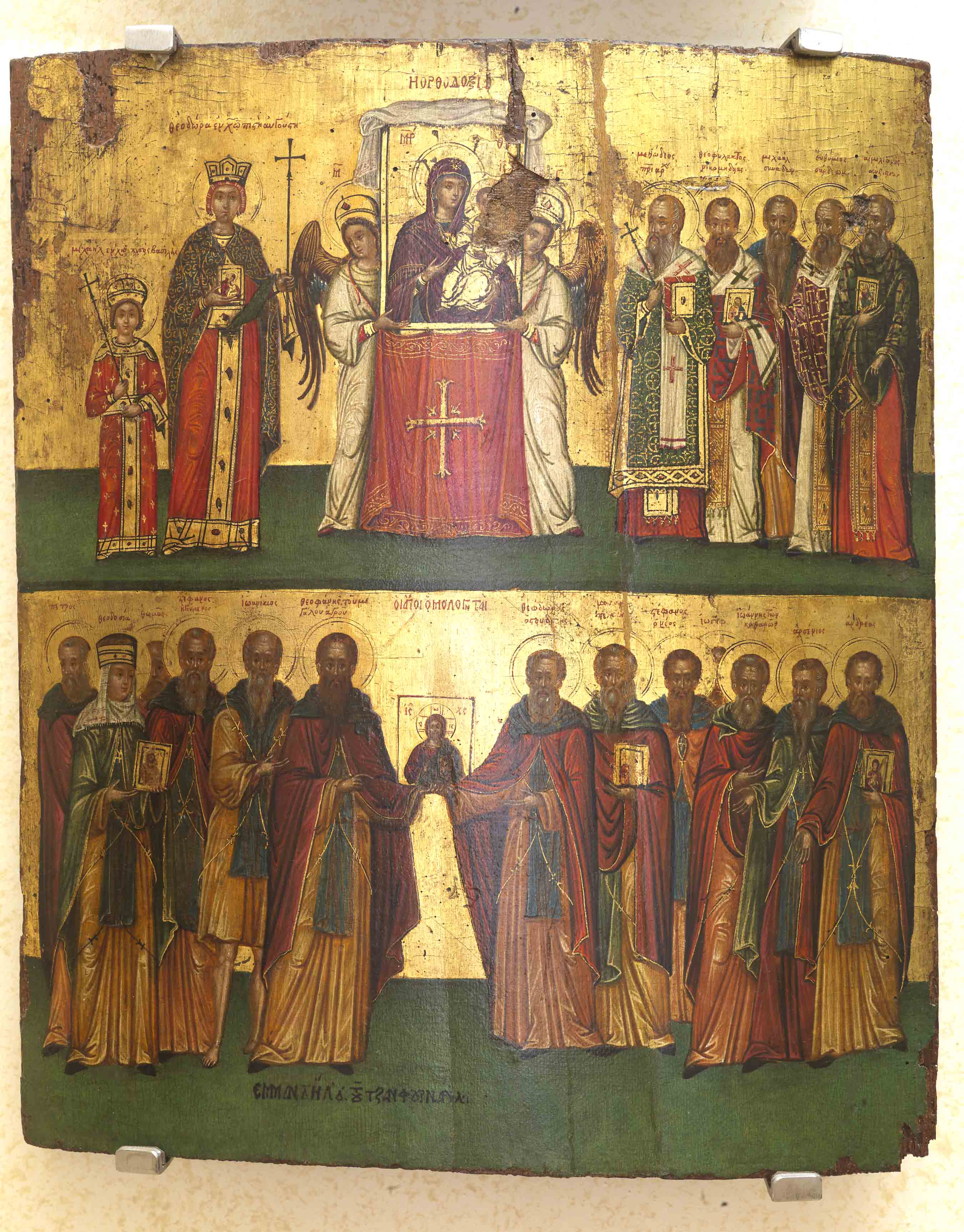
Triumph of Orthodoxy

== Bibliography ==
- Hatzidakis, Manolis (1987). Έλληνες Ζωγράφοι μετά την Άλωση (1450-1830). Τόμος 1: Αβέρκιος - Ιωσήφ [Greek Painters after the Fall of Constantinople (1450-1830). Volume 1: Averkios - Iosif]. Athens: Center for Modern Greek Studies, National Research Foundation. hdl:10442/14844. ISBN 960-7916-01-8.
- Hatzidakis, Manolis; Drakopoulou, Evgenia (1997). Έλληνες Ζωγράφοι μετά την Άλωση (1450-1830). Τόμος 2: Καβαλλάρος - Ψαθόπουλος [Greek Painters after the Fall of Constantinople (1450-1830). Volume 2: Kavallaros - Psathopoulos]. Athens: Center for Modern Greek Studies, National Research Foundation. hdl:10442/14088. ISBN 960-7916-00-X.
- Drakopoulou, Evgenia (2010). Έλληνες Ζωγράφοι μετά την Άλωση (1450–1830). Τόμος 3: Αβέρκιος - Ιωσήφ [Greek Painters after the Fall of Constantinople (1450–1830). Volume 3: Averkios - Joseph]. Athens, Greece: Center for Modern Greek Studies, National Research Foundation. ISBN 978-960-7916-94-5.
