= Catherine of Alexandria (Kornaros) =

Painting by Ioannis Kornaros

Saint Catherine of Alexandria
- Αγία Αικατερίνη (Greek), Caterina d'Alessandria (Italian)
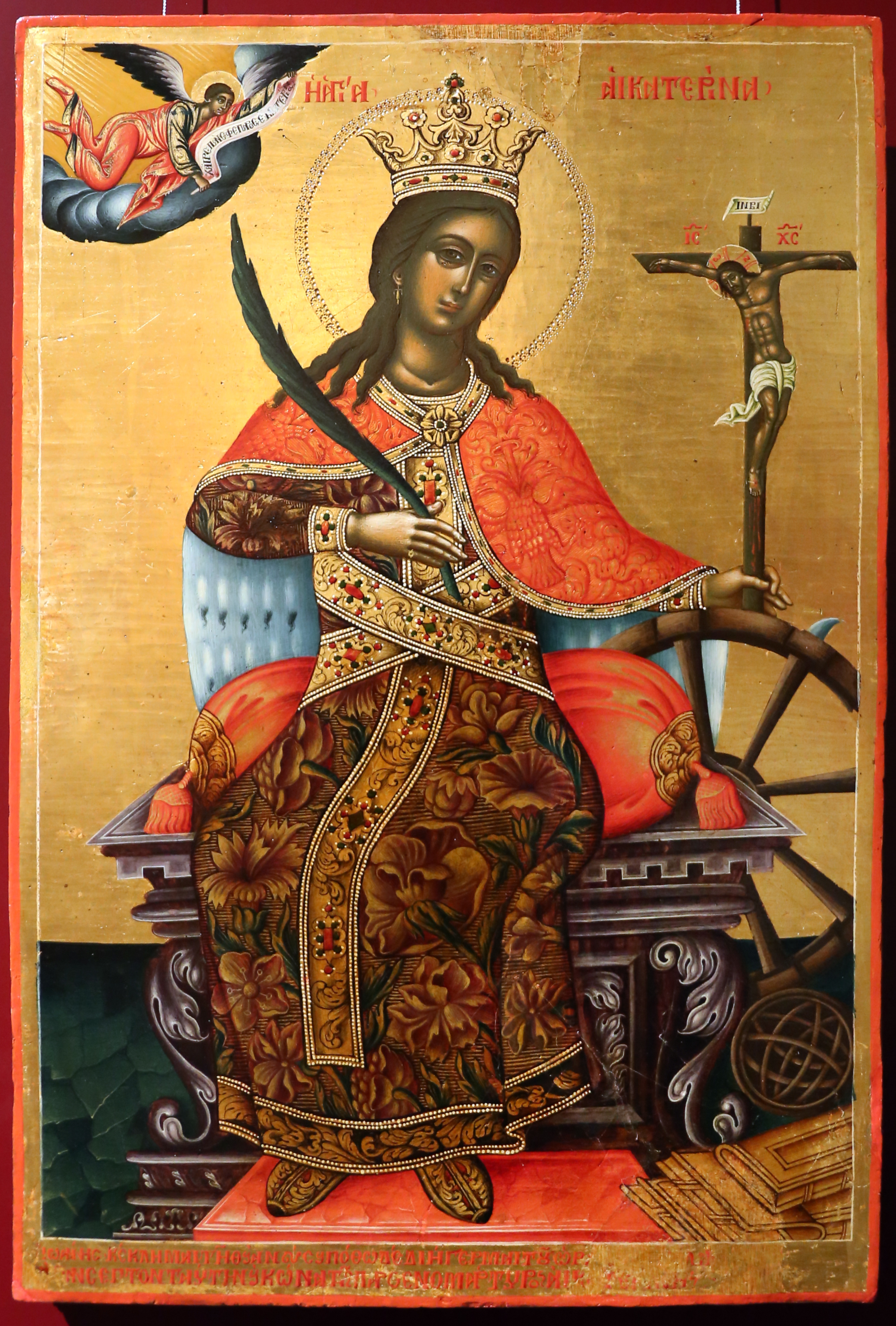
- Artist: Ioannis Kornaros
- Year: 1760-1821
- Medium: egg tempera, gold leaf on wood
- Movement: Late Cretan School
- Subject: Saint Catherine of Alexandria
- Dimensions: 60.5 cm × 41 cm (23.8 in × 16.1 in)
- Location: Museo della Città di Livorno; Livorno, Italy
- Owner: Museo della Città di Livorno

Catherine of Alexandria is a tempera painting created by Ioannis Kornaros. Kornaros was probably a monk in Crete during the period the Ottoman Empire occupied it from (1667–1898). He was a student of Georgios Kastrofylakas, and both painters were influenced by the late Cretan School. There were some painters residing in Crete after the Ottoman occupation, including Michael Prevelis. Oriental themes influenced some of Kastrofylakas' works. Both artists were part of the Greek Neoclassical era and the Modern Greek Enlightenment in art. One of Kornaros' most notable works is a painting entitled Great Art Thou (Megas Ei Kyrie). The painter was active in Crete, Mount Sinai, and Cyprus. He died the same year the Greek War of Independence began. According to the Institute of Neohellenic Research, forty-eight of his paintings have survived.

An educated princess named Catherine lived in Alexandria, Egypt, from around 287 to 305 AD. Emperor Maxentius tortured Catherine because she converted hundreds of people to the new Christian faith. A spiked wheel was used in an attempt to put her to death, but it shattered upon touching her. She was ultimately beheaded. Therefore, she is often depicted in art as an educated woman with a spiked wheel. She died seven years before Constantine recognized the new Christian religion. Saint Catherine has been depicted in art since her canonization around the 4th century. Ieremias Palladas completed one of the most influential paintings of the figure for the iconostasis of Saint Catherine's Monastery in Mount Sinai, Egypt, called Saint Catherine of Alexandria . It became the prototype for Catherine of Alexandria and was copied by many painters. Kornaros traveled to Saint Catherine's sacred monastery in Egypt, also known as Mount Sinai, where he was exposed to the works of Palladas. Kornaros was one of the first to depict a Palladas-inspired Catherine as a youthful woman. A notable Greek work featuring a youthful Saint Catherine was completed by Georgios Klontzas in the 16th century, entitled Saint Catherine's Engagement. Kornaros' work can be found in Tuscany in the city of Livorno, Italy, at the Museo della Città di Livorno.

== Description ==
The materials used were egg tempera paint on gold leaf and wood panel. The height is 23.8 in (60.4 cm) and the width: 16.1 in (40.8 cm). The work of art was completed sometime between 1760 - 1821. Kornaros, like his contemporaries, emulates the prototype of Catherine of Alexandria created by Ieremias Palladas. Typical elements are present, such as the martyr's palm, spiked wheel, astrolabe, crucifix with Jesus and books. Saint Catherine sits on a throne wearing a dress inlaid with floral elements typical of the 18th century. She is wearing a cape-like Pellegrina which is draped over her dress. It follows the traditional Greek, Italian Byzantine style where the stole is draped over her left shoulder and also features two eagles. The work features elements of Venetian painting and blends the Cretan style. The figure of Catherine is a youthful young girl who escapes the typical representation of other Cretan painters who depict the subject as an older woman. The inscription reads:

ΙΩΑΝΝΗΣ, ΚΕΚΛΗΜΑΙ ΤΗ ΘΕΙΑ ΝΕΥ ΣΕΙ ΠΟΘΩ ΔΕ ΔΙΗΓΕΡΜΑΙ ΤΟΥ ΩΡΑΪΣΑΙ/ ΤΟ [...];" ΠΑΝ ΣΕΠΤΟΝ ΤΑΥ ΤΗΝ ΕΙΚΟΝΑ / [...] ΤΗΣ ΠΑΡΘΕΝΟΜΑΡΤΥΡΟΣ ΑΙΚΑΤΕΡΙΝΑΣ (I, JOHN, CALL ON THEE THE NEW GOD, I WISH, I WAS NOT AWARE OF THE BEAUTY/ THE [...];" EVERY DIVINITY OF THIS IMAGE/ [...] OF THE VIRGIN-MARTYR EKATERINA).

== Gallery ==
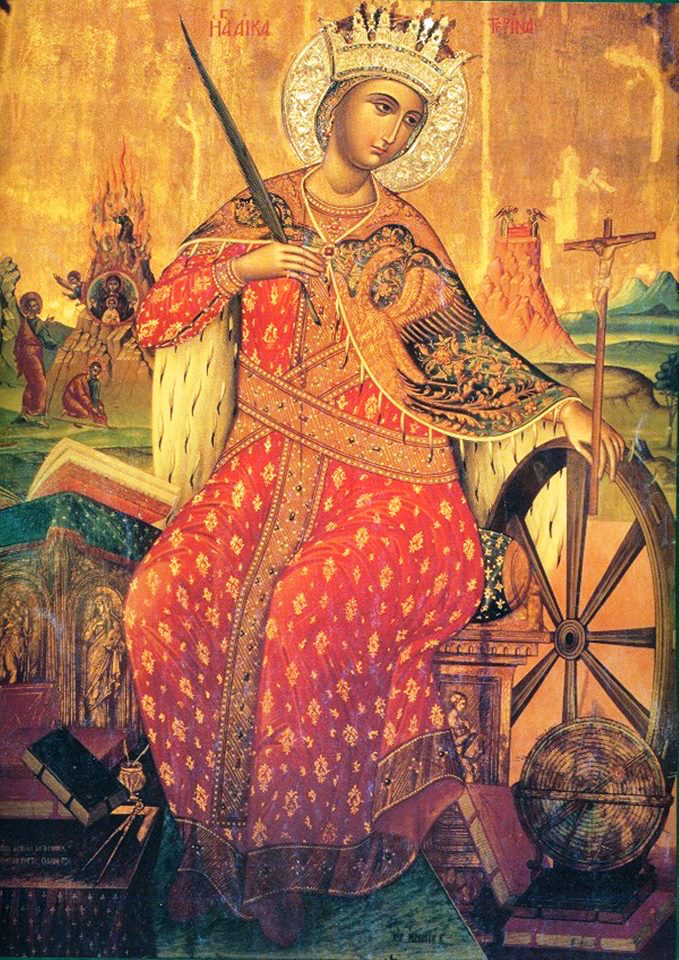
Saint Catherine by Ieremias Palladas, c. 1612

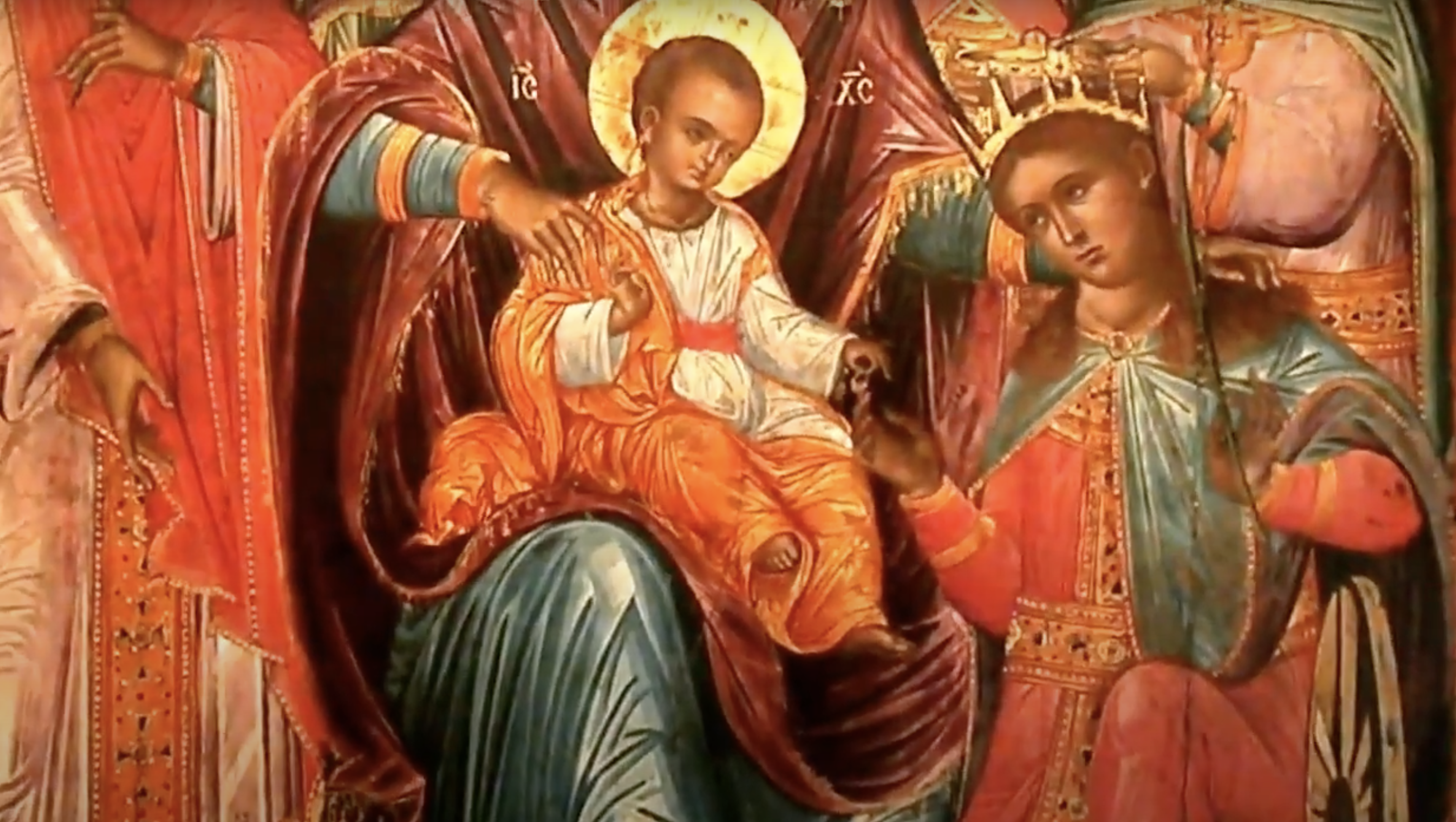
Saint Catherine's Engagement by Georgios Klontzas, c. 1560-1608

=== Youthful Catherines ===
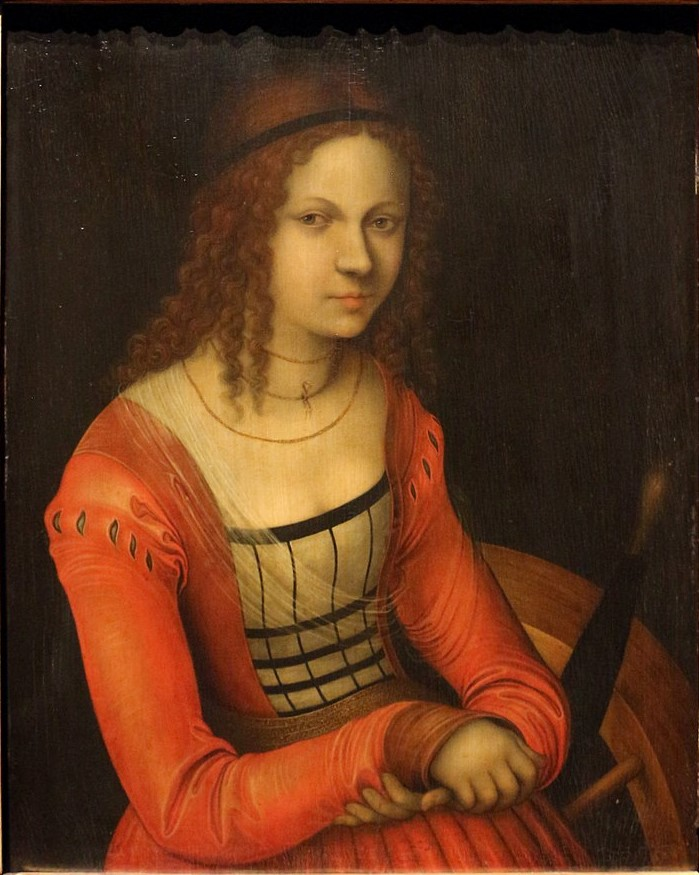
Portrait of Youthful Saint Catherine by Lucas Cranach the Elder, c. 1500-1553

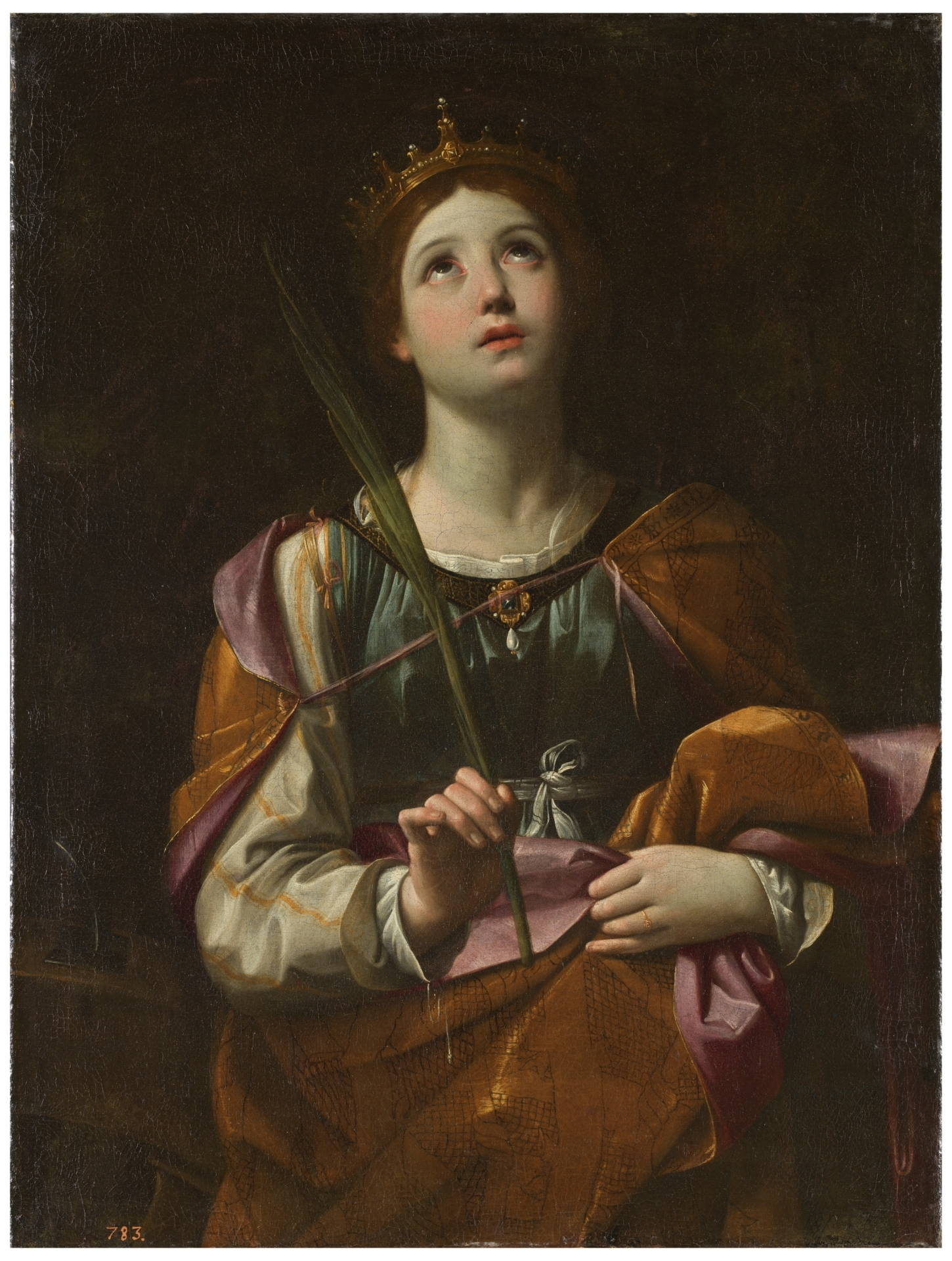
Saint Catherine by Guido Reni, c. 1606

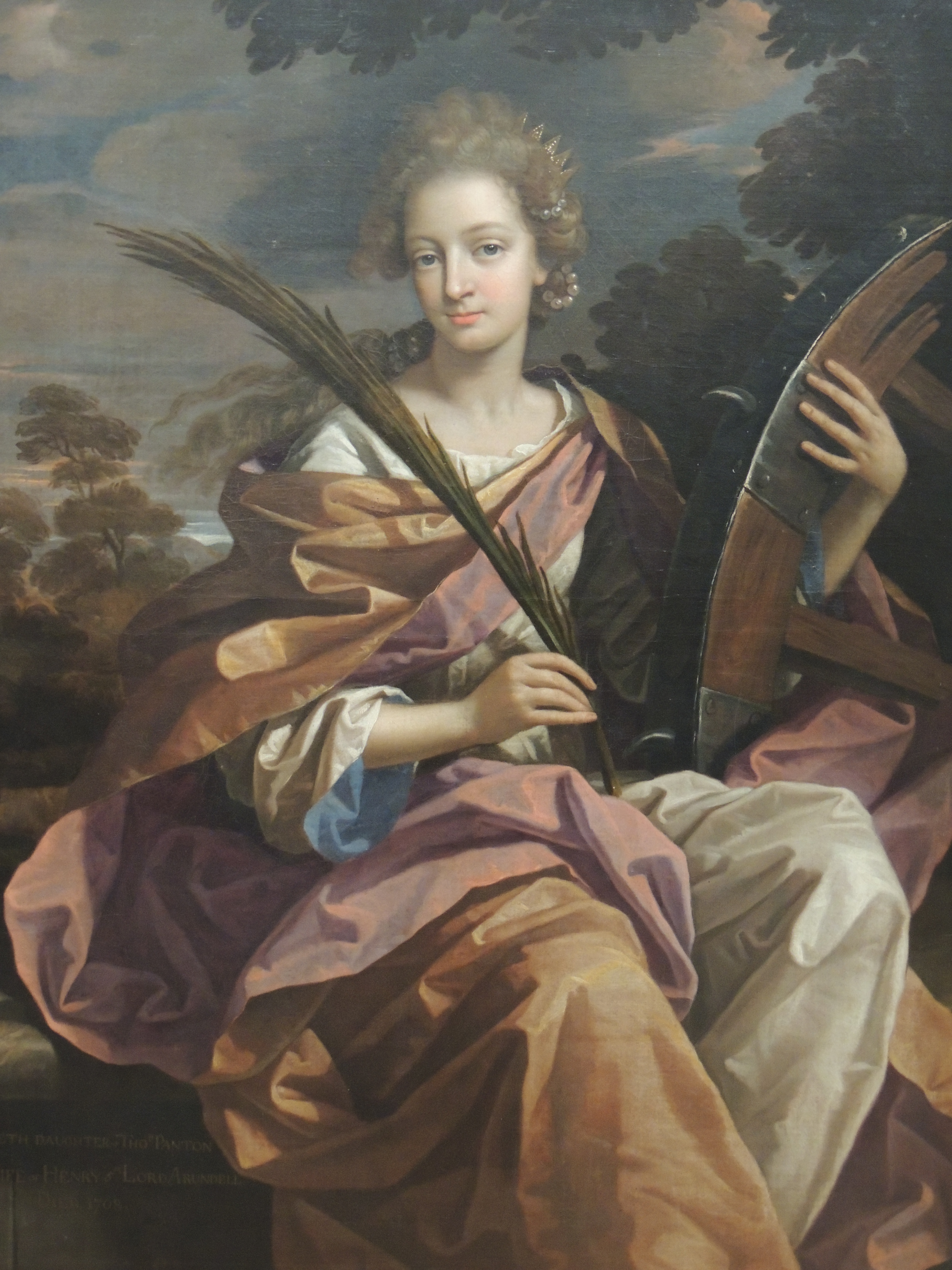
Portrait of Elizabeth Panton as Catherine by Benedetto Gennari II, c. 1689

== Bibliography ==
- Hatzidakis, Manolis; Drakopoulou, Evgenia (1997). Έλληνες Ζωγράφοι μετά την Άλωση (1450-1830). Τόμος 2: Καβαλλάρος - Ψαθόπουλος [Greek Painters after the Fall of Constantinople (1450-1830). Volume 2: Kavallaros - Psathopoulos]. Athens: Center for Modern Greek Studies, National Research Foundation. hdl:10442/14088. ISBN 960-7916-00-X.
- Passarelli, Gaetano (2001). Le Iconostasi e le Ιcone di Livorno [The Iconostasis and Icons of Livorno] (PDF). Pisa, Italy: Le Industrie Grafiche of Pacini Editore S.P.A. p. 168. Archived (PDF) from the original on July 1, 2022.
- Collins, Kristen M. (2006). Holy Image, Hallowed Ground: Icons from Sinai. Los Angeles: California: J. Paul Getty Museum. ISBN 9780892368563.
