= The Prophet Jonah (Stavrakis) =

Painting by Demetrios Stavrakis

- Ο Προφήτης Ιωνάς (Greek), Il Profitto Giona (Italian)
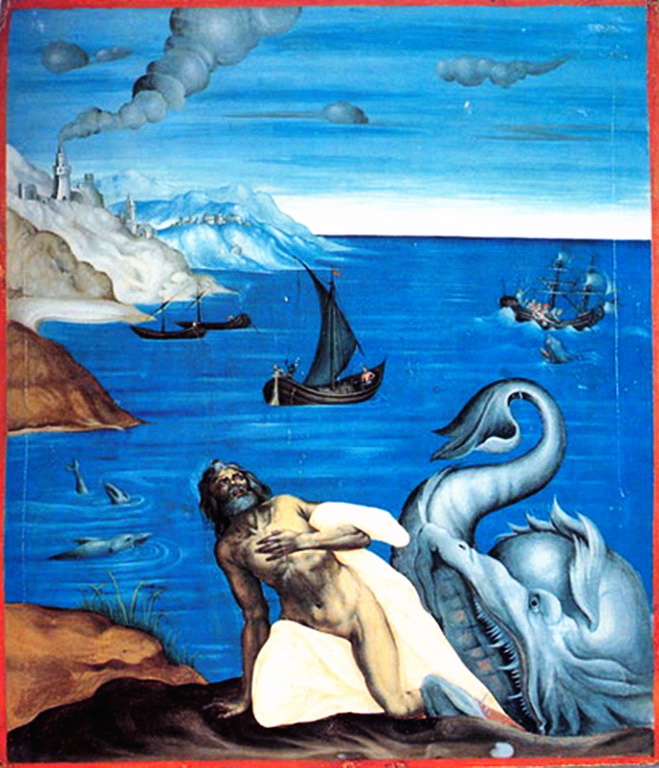
- Artist: Demetrios Stavrakis
- Year: c. 1750 - 1800
- Medium: tempera on wood
- Movement: Heptanese School
- Subject: Jonah and the Whale
- Dimensions: 42.8 cm × 37 cm (16.8 in × 14.5 in)
- Location: Zakynthos Museum, Zakynthos, Greece
- Owner: Zakynthos Museum

The Prophet Jonah was a tempera painting created by Demetrios Stavrakis, a Greek painter representing the Heptanese School.

According to the Book of Jonah the Prophet, during his lifetime Jonah was commanded by God to travel to the city Nineveh to condemn their wickedness. He decided to flee from the presence of the lord and he set sail for Tarshish, a huge storm arose. The sailors realized that it was no ordinary storm and that Jonah was to blame. Jonah admitted that he was to blame and that if he was thrown overboard, the storm will cease. After being cast from the ship, Jonah was swallowed by a whale. He resided in the belly of the whale for three days and three nights. Completely distraught he prayed to God and promised to do what he was asked. God commanded the whale to vomit Jonah. The story inspired countless paintings about Jonah and the whale.

Notable versions of Jonah and the whale were completed by famous artists from all over the world namely Pieter Lastman, Jacopo Tintoretto, and Michelangelo. Jan Sadeler I was a Flemish Renaissance engraver. His career began in Antwerp and he eventually migrated to Venice with his brother and son. He died in Venice around 1600. His engravings influenced countless Greek painters namely Theodore Poulakis, Georgios Markazinis and Konstantinos Tzanes. Stavrakis also used one of his engravings for The Prophet Jonah. The painting is part of the collection of the Byzantine Museum of Zakynthos.

== History ==
The materials used were egg tempera paint on a wood panel. The height is 42.8 cm (16.8 in) and the width is 37 cm (14.5 in). The painting was taken from the church Agios Spyridon Flampouriaris. Another painting with the use of similar colored paint was also taken from the same church called The Miracle of Saint Spyridon. Both paintings were painted with a distinct blue color. Ioannis Kornaros used blue in his famous painting entitled Great Art Thou (Megas Ei Kyrie). Blue was rarely used by Cretan Renaissance painters. Greek artists of the later periods also avoided blue.

The whale is larger in the Sadeler engraving. The figure of Jonah also takes up more of the engraving than Stavraki's painting. In Stavraki's painting, a boat is traveling in the middle ground. In the background of the painting, the boat is clearly sinking and a large whale head protrudes from the water. In the foreground, the story ends with Jonah regurgitated from the whale's mouth.

Clearly, the painting animates the landscape with brilliant shades of blue. The artist imbues change with his advanced knowledge of spatial depth and deeper space. The work escapes the maniera greca and enforces enhanced three-dimensionality. The natural figure draws from the Greek mythological God Poseidon (Neptune). Jonah is a sculpturesque, simple and weighty figure. The whale is painted in superlative detail. The artist uses shadows to accentuate dimensionality.

== Gallery ==
=== Contemporaries ===
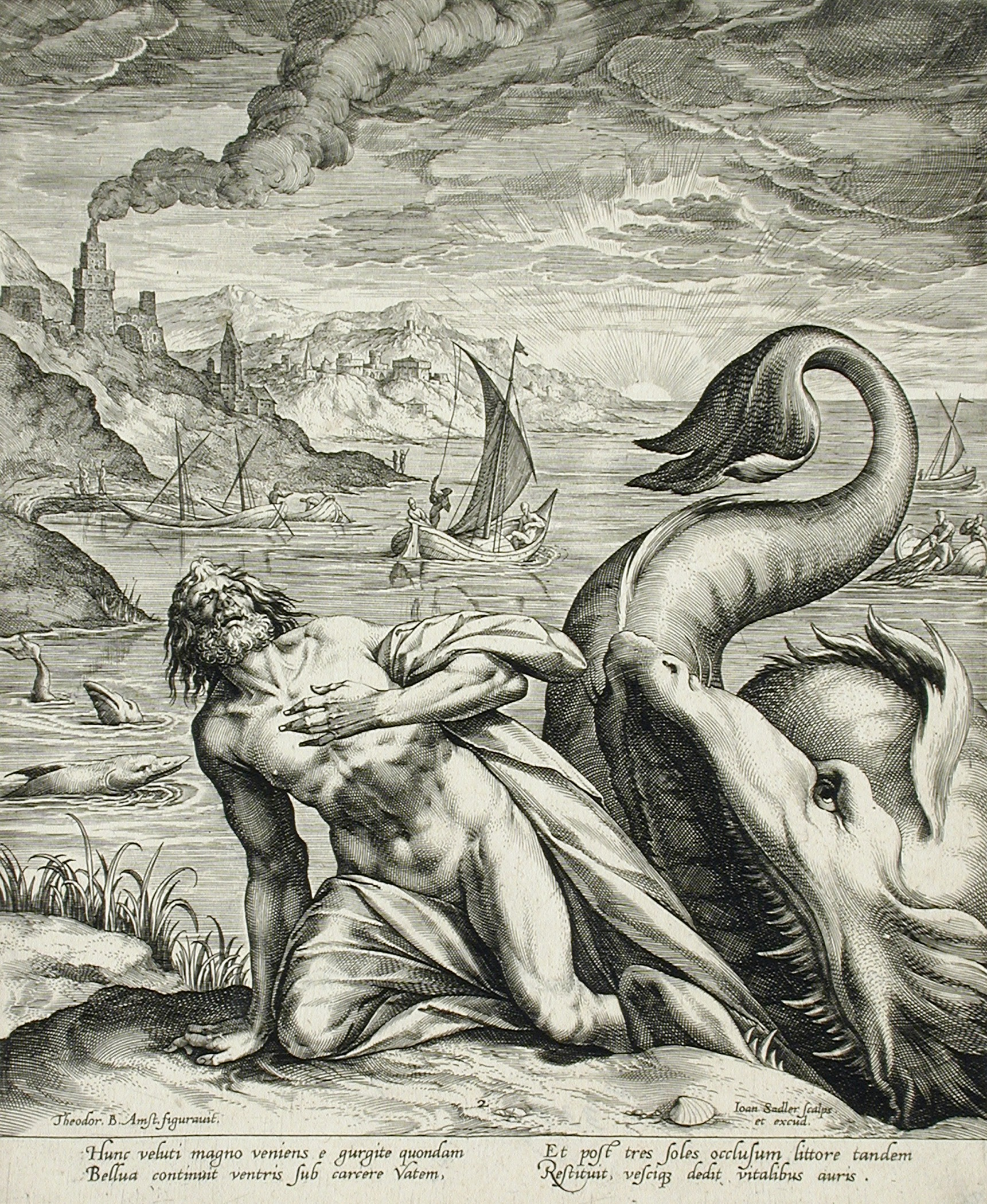
Jonah and the Whale Sadeler

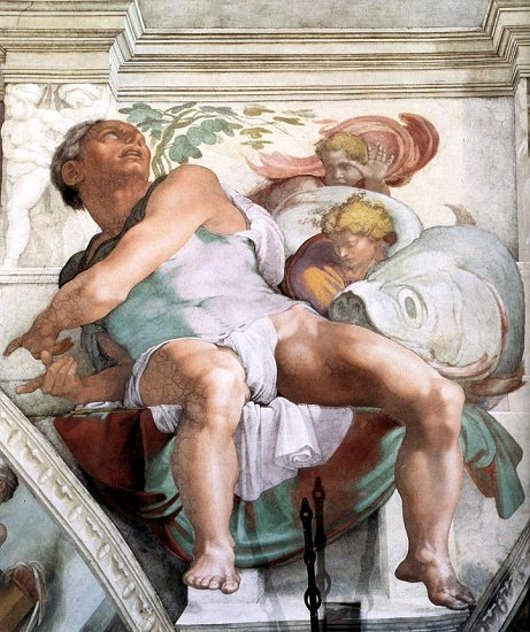
Prophet Jonah Michelangelo

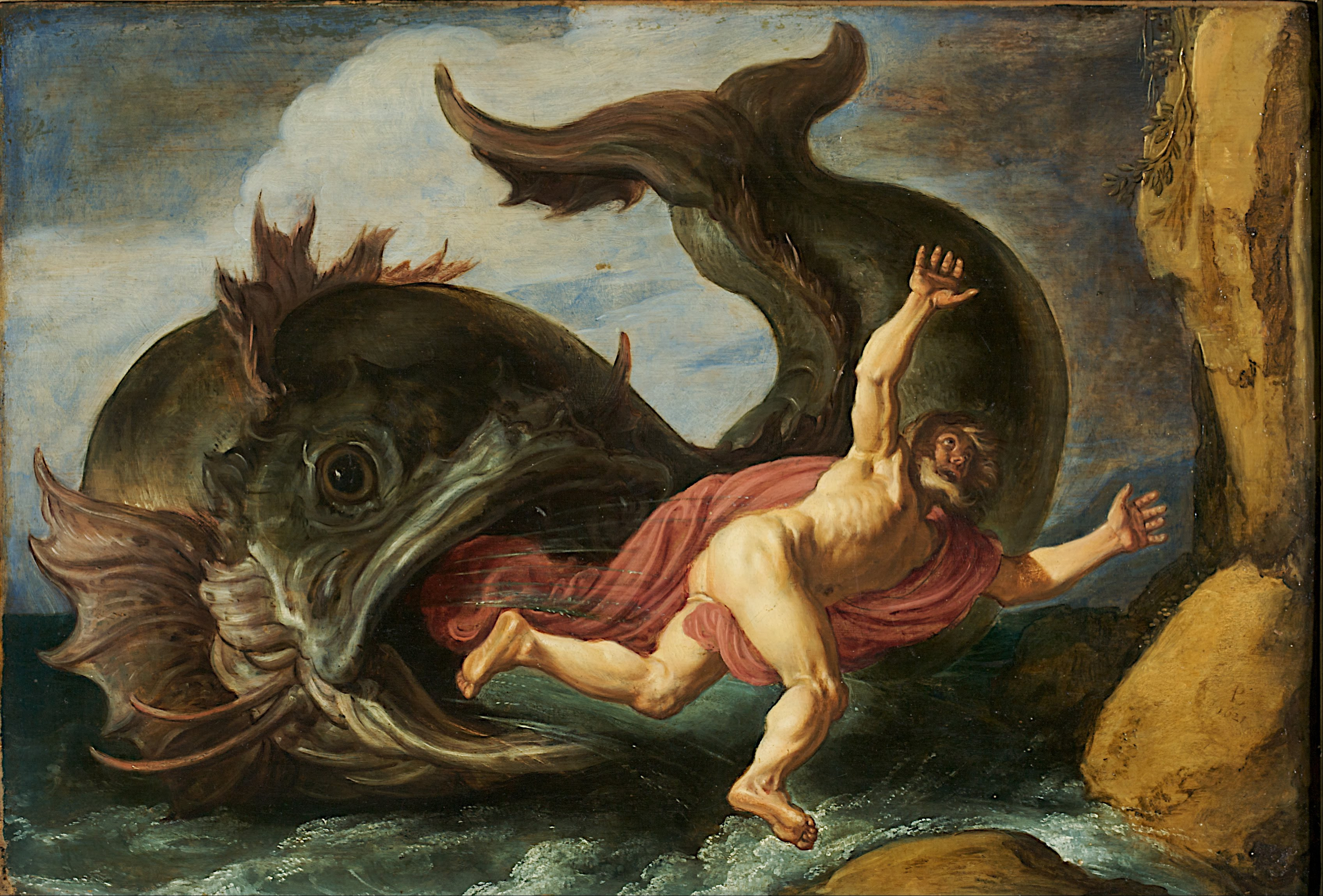
Jonah and the Whale Lastman

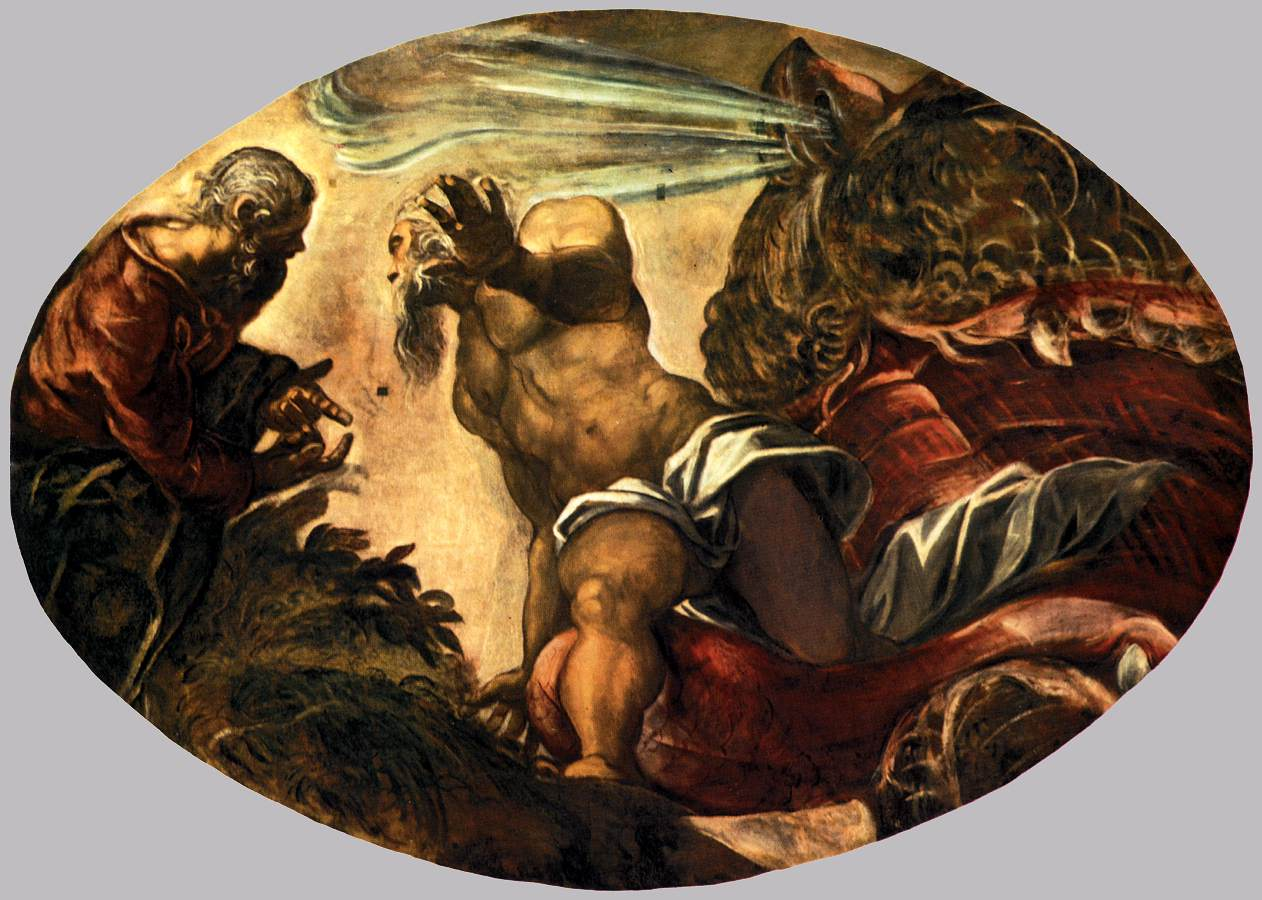
Jonah Leaves the Whale Tintoretto

=== Greek Blue ===
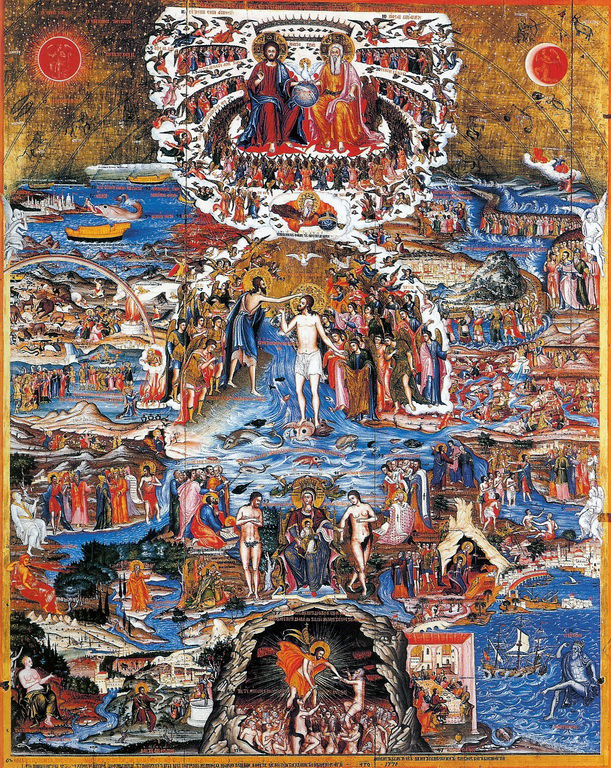
Megas Ei Kyrie Kornaros

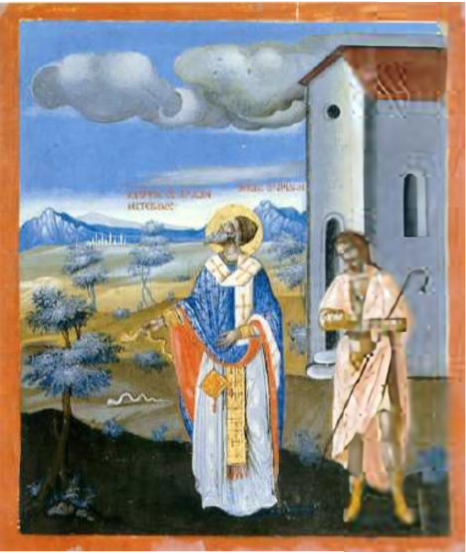
The Miracle of Saint Spyridon Stavrakis
