= Michael Prevelis =

18th century Greek painter

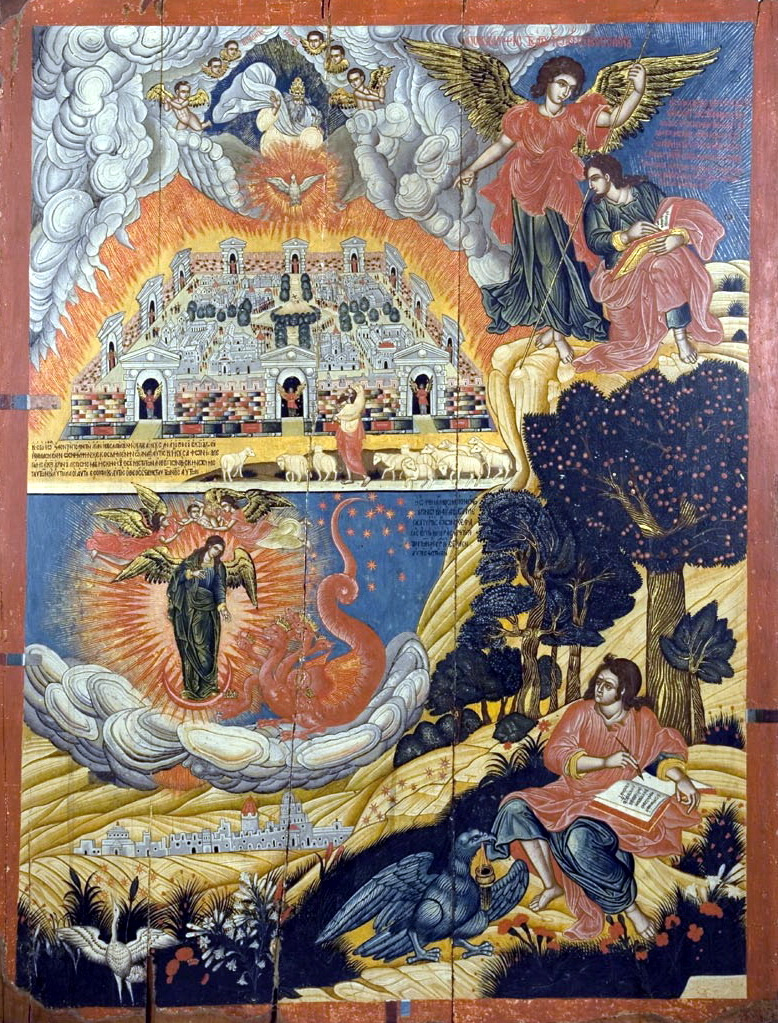
- Book of Revelation
- Born: 1700s Crete, Greece
- Died: 1700s Crete, Greece
- Movement: Neo-Hellenikos Diafotismos; Greek Rococo; Greek Baroque
- Occupation: Painter
- Years active: 1750s
- Era: 18th Century
- Employer: The Holy Monastery of Preveli
- Style: Maniera Greca

Michael Prevelis (Greek: Μιχαήλ Πρέβελης, 1700s – 1700s). He was a Greek painter. He was active on the island of Crete during the eighteenth century. He was one of few Greek painters still active on the island. Other painters included: Ioannis Kornaros and Georgios Kastrofylakas. His work diverged from the traditional Greek mannerism. He was a representative of the Neo-Hellenikos Diafotismos in art, he was another representative of the Greek Rococo and Baroque periods. The Greek mannerisms were reflected in iconography and other painted mediums at the time. Nine of his works have survived they are all located at the Preveli Monastery. His most notable work is the Book of Revelation.

== History ==
Prevelis was born on the island of Crete. He was a monk affiliated with Preveli Monastery. He adopted the name Prevelis due to his association with the monastery. Historians believe he was exposed to Flemish baroque engravings. Flemish art influenced the entire region namely the works of the Sadeler brothers and their contemporaries. He painted the Creation of Man. The Revelation similarly occupies the same spatial design, yet it is coloristically different. The famous painting of the Revelation is coloristically similar to Ioannis Kornaros’s Great Art Thou (Megas Ei Kyrie).

Historians defined Prevelis’s activity during the middle part of the 1700s. Ioannis Kornaros may have been exposed to his work. Prevelis’s work does not match the typical Cretan style prevalent one hundred years prior to his arrival as a painter. His brand of art fits into the circle of Ioannis Kornaros and Georgios Kastrofylakas. The same fusion was taking place in the Greek mannerism of Cycladic art primarily represented by Defterevon Sifnios and his contemporaries.

== Gallery ==
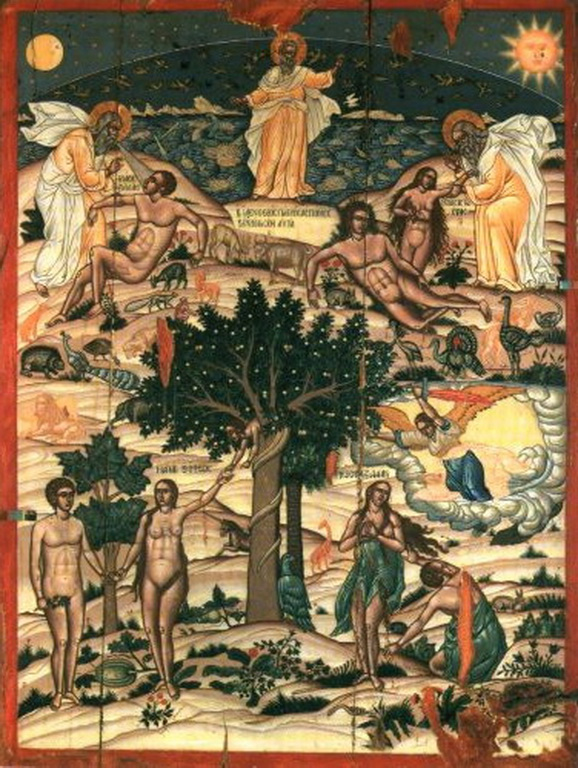
Creation of Man

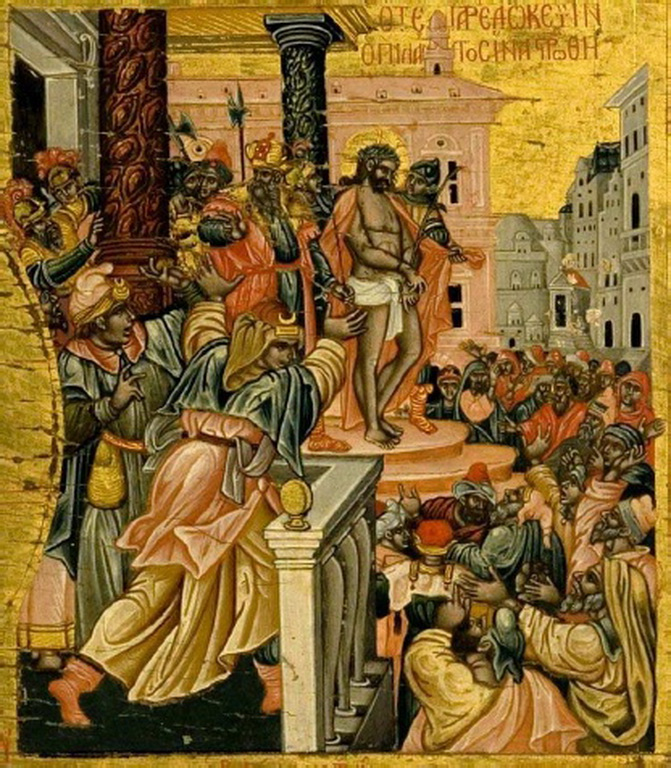
Behold the Man

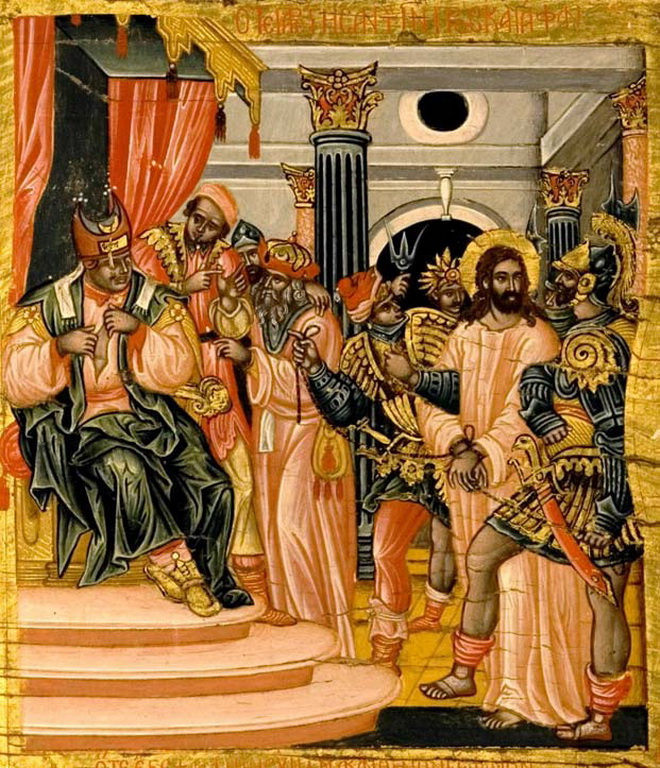
Christ before Caiaphas

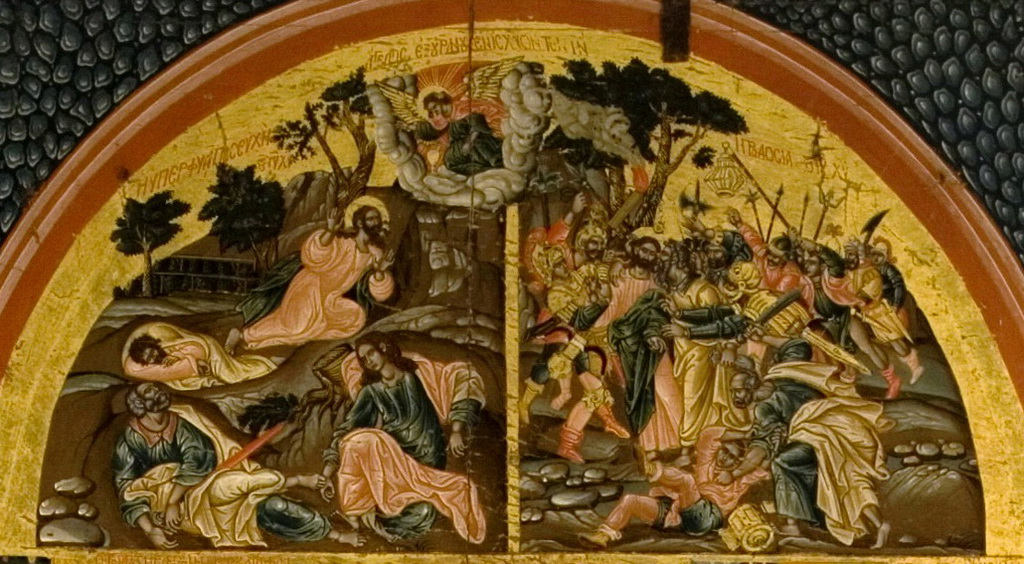
The Betrayal of Christ

== Bibliography ==
- Hatzidakis, Manolis (1987). Greek painters after the fall (1450-1830) Volume A. Athens, GR: Center for Modern Greek Studies E.I.E.
- Hatzidakis, Manolis & Drakopoulou, Eugenia (1997). Greek painters after the fall (1450-1830) Volume B. Athens, GR: Center for Modern Greek Studies E.I.E.
- Drakopoulou, Eugenia (2010). Greek painters after the fall (1450-1830) Volume C. Athens, GR: Center for Modern Greek Studies E.I.E.
