= Ioannis Kornaros =

Greek painter

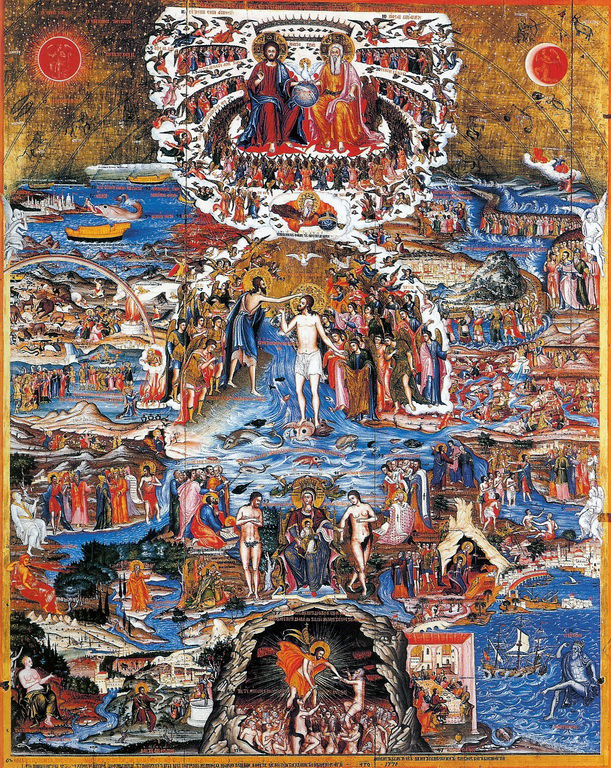
- Great Art Thou (Megas Ei Kyrie)
- Born: 1745; Crete
- Died: 1821 (aged 75–76); Cyprus
- Known for: Iconography and hagiography
- Movement: Neoclassicism; Greek Romanticism

Ioannis Kornaros (Greek: Ιωάννης Κορνάρος, 1745 – 1821) was a Greek painter. He was one of the few painters from Crete during the 19th century. He does not belong to the Cretan Renaissance but was influenced by the art. He is considered to be one of the foremost icon painters of the Greek Neoclassical era and Modern Greek Enlightenment in art also known as Neo Hellenikos Diafotismos. He implemented a unique style. He was influenced by Michael Damaskinos, Georgios Klontzas, Victor and other Cretan artists. He influenced Modern Greek art. He is one few Greek painters affiliated with Cyprus. Others included Ioannis Kyprios and Theodore Apsevdis. His teacher was Georgios Kastrofylakas. His most famous painting Great Art Thou (Megas Ei Kyrie) resembles Georgios Klontzas's In Thee Rejoiceth.

== History ==
He was born in Crete. According to a signed icon from the Toplou Monastery. He declared he was 25 years old. He was probably a monk at the monastery. He also painted an icon at the Savvathianon Monastery in Heraklion. Because of his unique style historians have deduced famous painter Georgios Kastrofylakas was his teacher. By 1775, according to the signature on his work, he was at Saint Catherine's Monastery in Mount Sinai. While at Mount Sinai he was hired by the Bishop of Sinai Cyril II to paint icons. He was also from Crete. In addition to creating his own signed work, Kornaros created many paintings with forged signatures and dates. His favorite artists were Michael Damaskinos, Georgios Klontzas, Victor and Angelos Akotantos. He painted the icons with a disposition of Cretan patriotism and chauvinism. He also decorated the ceiling at Saint Catherine's Monastery. He arrived in Cyprus around 1787.

Historians are unsure of the length of his stay in Cyprus or the definite year of his death. According to a document of the 19th century, in 1821 he was in Cyprus. His last signed works on the island are from 1812. While he was in Cyprus he created a large number of icons, and engravings. He created designs for icon covers mainly gold and silver. Most of the templates were for icons of the Virgin Mary. He had many students in Cyprus. Many artists in the region emulated his work. One painting of Agia Paraskevi in 1806 was signed by the hand of the students of Kornaros. The painting was in the Church of Eucosia. Kornaros's painting style was unique and drastically diverged from the existent styles and trends. Painter Christodoulos Kalergis and Kornaros developed a unique blend of the Cretan and Heptenese schools. Both artists offered a unique mixture of Byzantine, Venetian, Cretan, and Heptenese art.

The artists belonged to the Greek Neoclassical era and the Modern Greek Enlightenment in art. The movement was known as Neo Hellenikos Diafotismos. The artists of this era in art gave rise to the Greek Romantic Era and Modern Greek Art. He died the same year the Greek War of Independence began. According to the Institute of Neohellenic Research, forty-eight paintings have survived.

== Gallery ==
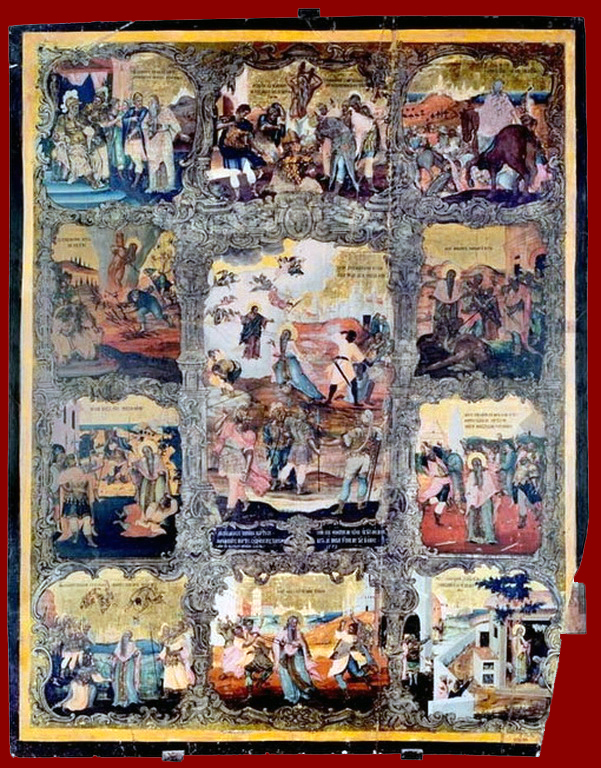
Saint Charalambos

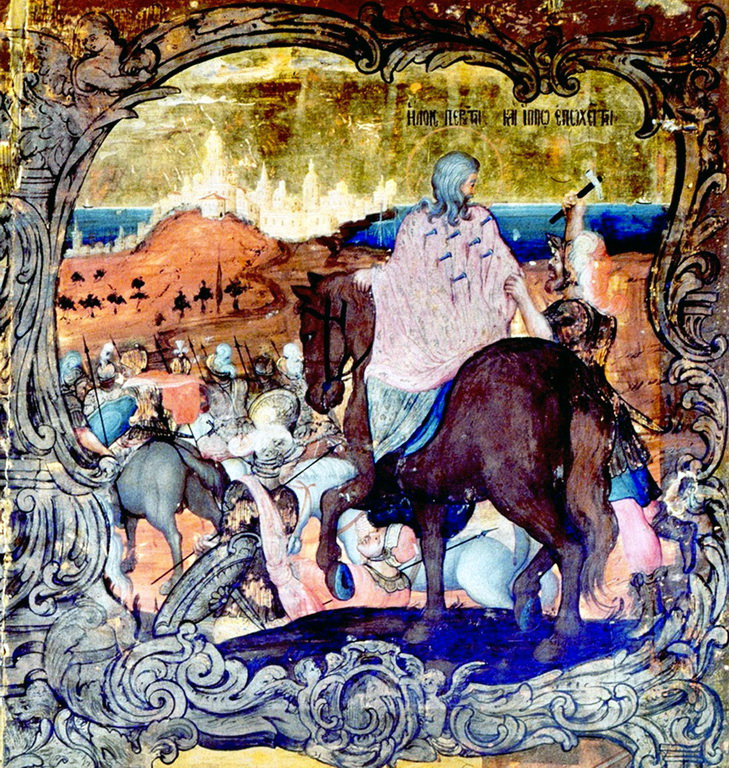
Saint Charalambos detail

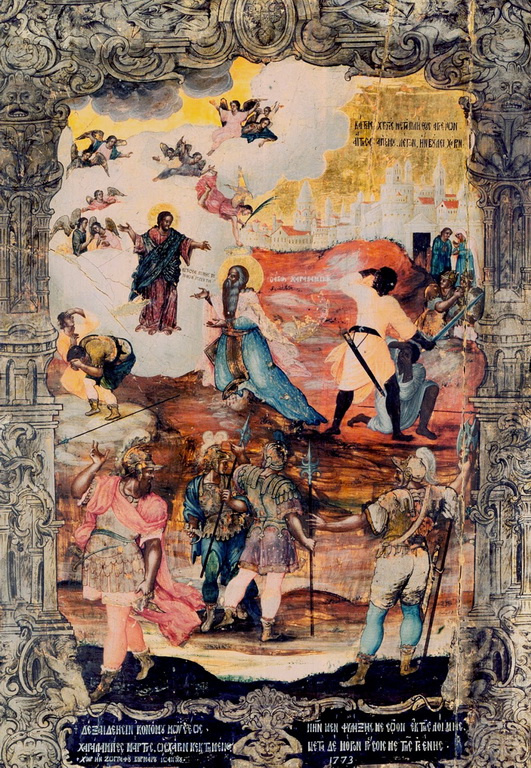
Saint Charalambos detail 2

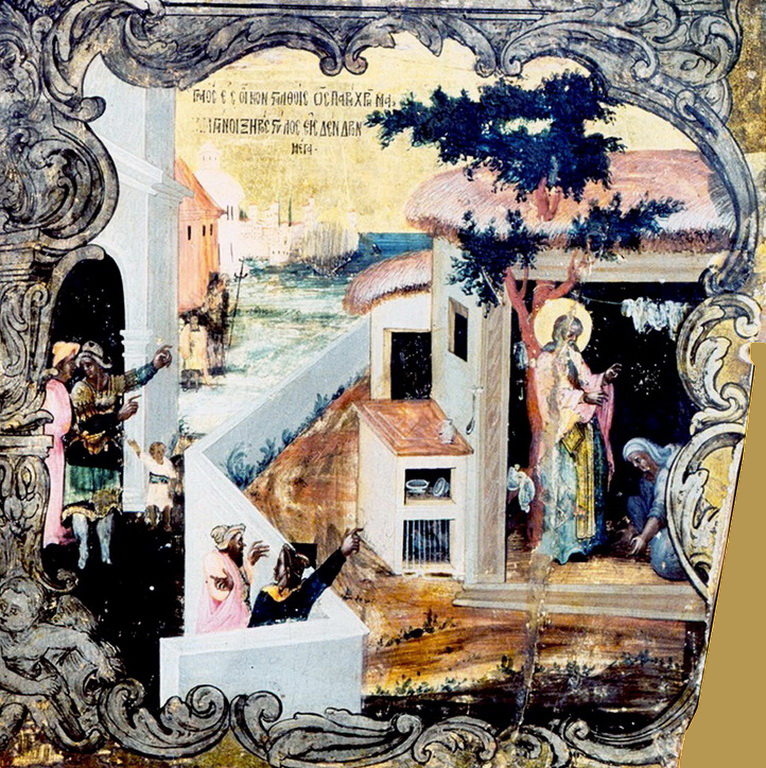
Saint Charalambos detail 3

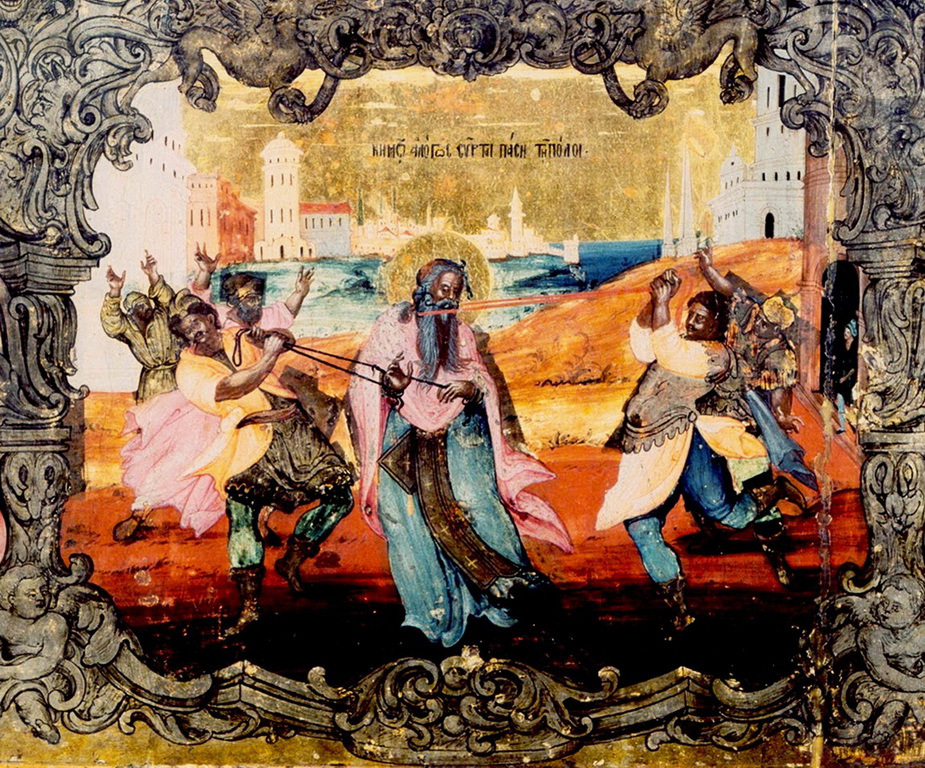
Saint Charalambos detail 4

== See also ==
- Emmanuel Skordilis
- Michael Prevelis
- Catherine of Alexandria (Kornaros)

== Bibliography ==
- Hatzidakis, Manolis (1987). Greek painters after the fall (1450-1830) Volume A. Athens, GR: Center for Modern Greek Studies E.I.E.
- Hatzidakis, Manolis & Drakopoulou, Eugenia (1997). Greek painters after the fall (1450-1830) Volume B. Athens, GR: Center for Modern Greek Studies E.I.E.
- Drakopoulou, Eugenia (2010). Greek painters after the fall (1450-1830) Volume C. Athens, GR: Center for Modern Greek Studies E.I.E.
