= Georgios Kastrofylakas =

18th-century painter in Crete

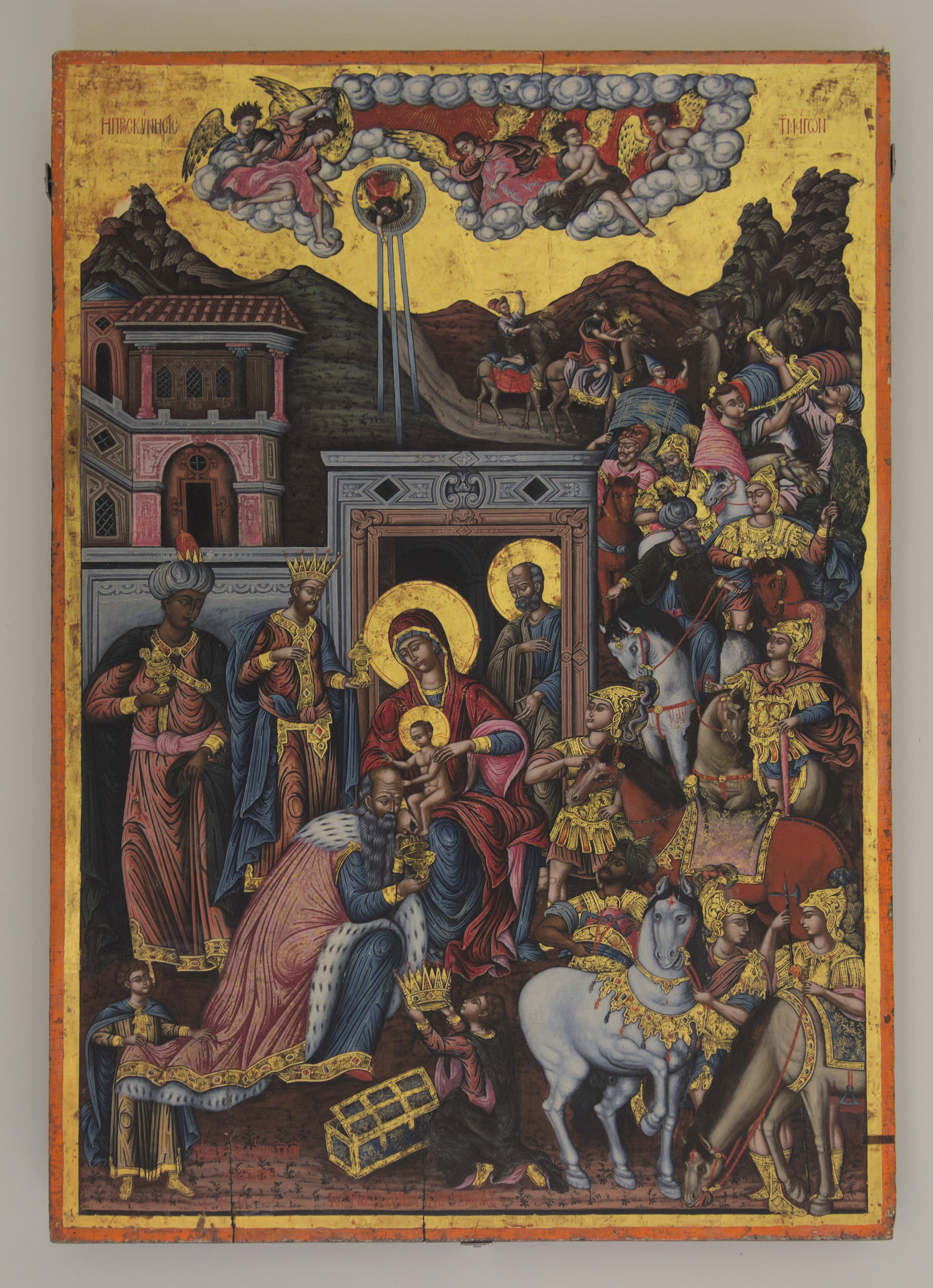
- The Adoration of the Magi
- Born: 1699-1705; Heraklion
- Died: 1760-1770; Heraklion
- Known for: Iconography and hagiography
- Movement: Greek Rococo

Georgios Kastrofylakas (Greek: Γεώργιος Καστροφύλακας, 1699/1705 – 1760/1770), also known as Georgios Kastrofylax or (Zorzis). He is one of the few Greek painters that remained in Crete. Others included Ioannis Kornaros. Kornaros was his student. Kastrofylakas followed the lines of the Cretan School. His work was influenced by legendary artists such as Georgios Klontzas, Michael Damaskinos and Angelos. Historians argue Kastrofylakas had many students due to the resemblance of his work. He belongs to the Neo-Hellenikos Diafotismos in painting and the Greek Rococo period. He influenced countless Greek iconographers. Thirty-six paintings are attributed to Kastrofylakas. The artist added more realism to his paintings. Most of his artwork is in Heraklion, Crete. His most notable work is the Adoration of the Magi.

== History ==
Kastrofylakas was born in Crete. Many of the artists migrated to Venice and the Ionian islands. Not much is known about his life. Historians used his signature to create a timeline of his works. His work is dated between 1719 and 1760. He stayed on the island of Crete; his workshop was active in Heraklion. Two painters Polychronious and Ioannis Kornaros may have studied with Kastrofylakas. He painted theological themes. In his painting of Agios Minas the horse has more depth. The painting escapes the traditional style and creates more realism. His paintings often have more decoration in line with the Greek Rococo period. His beheading of John the Baptist is clearly influenced by Michael Damaskinos. One of his notable works is at Saint Catherine's Monastery in Sinai, Egypt.

== Gallery ==
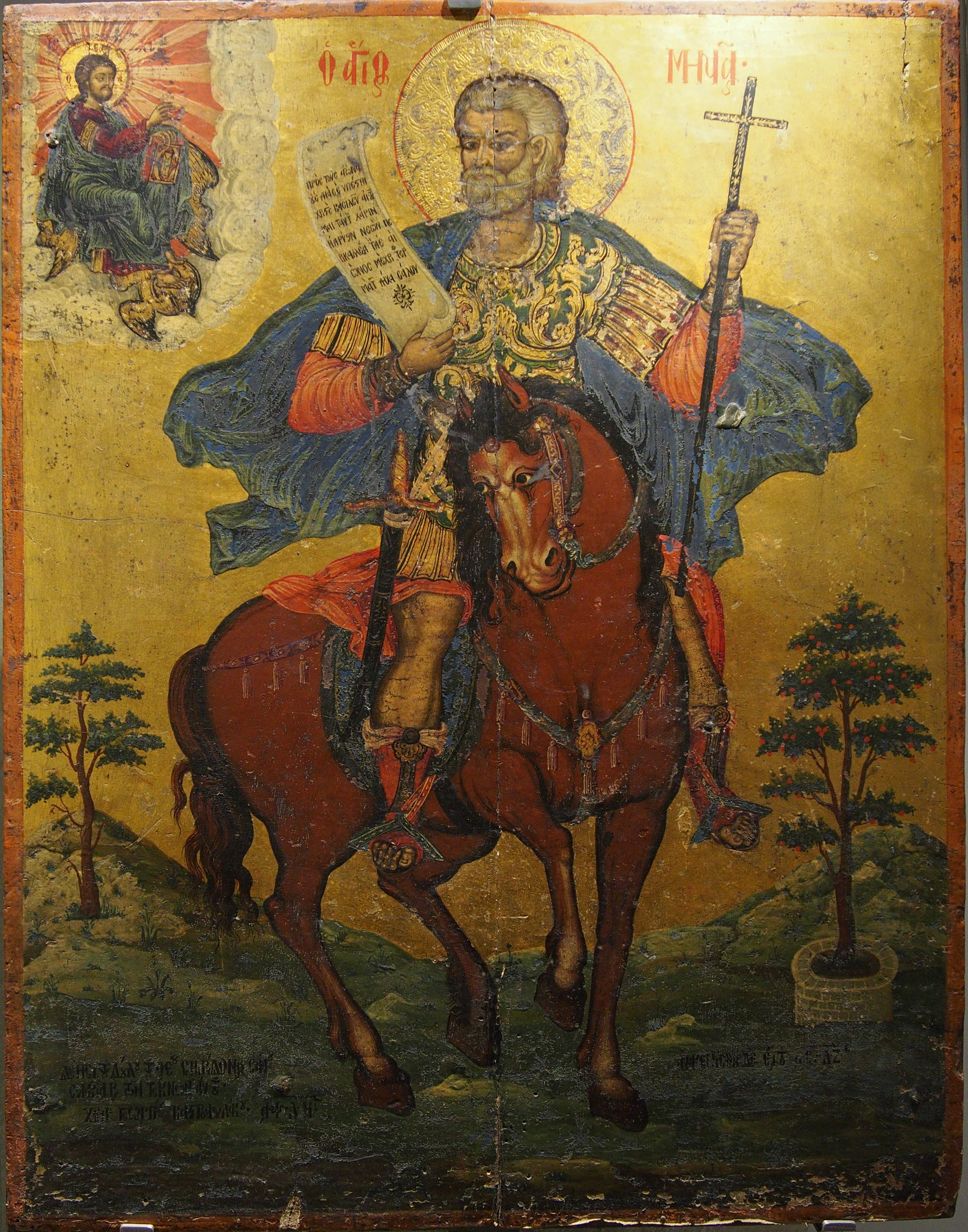
Menas of Egypt

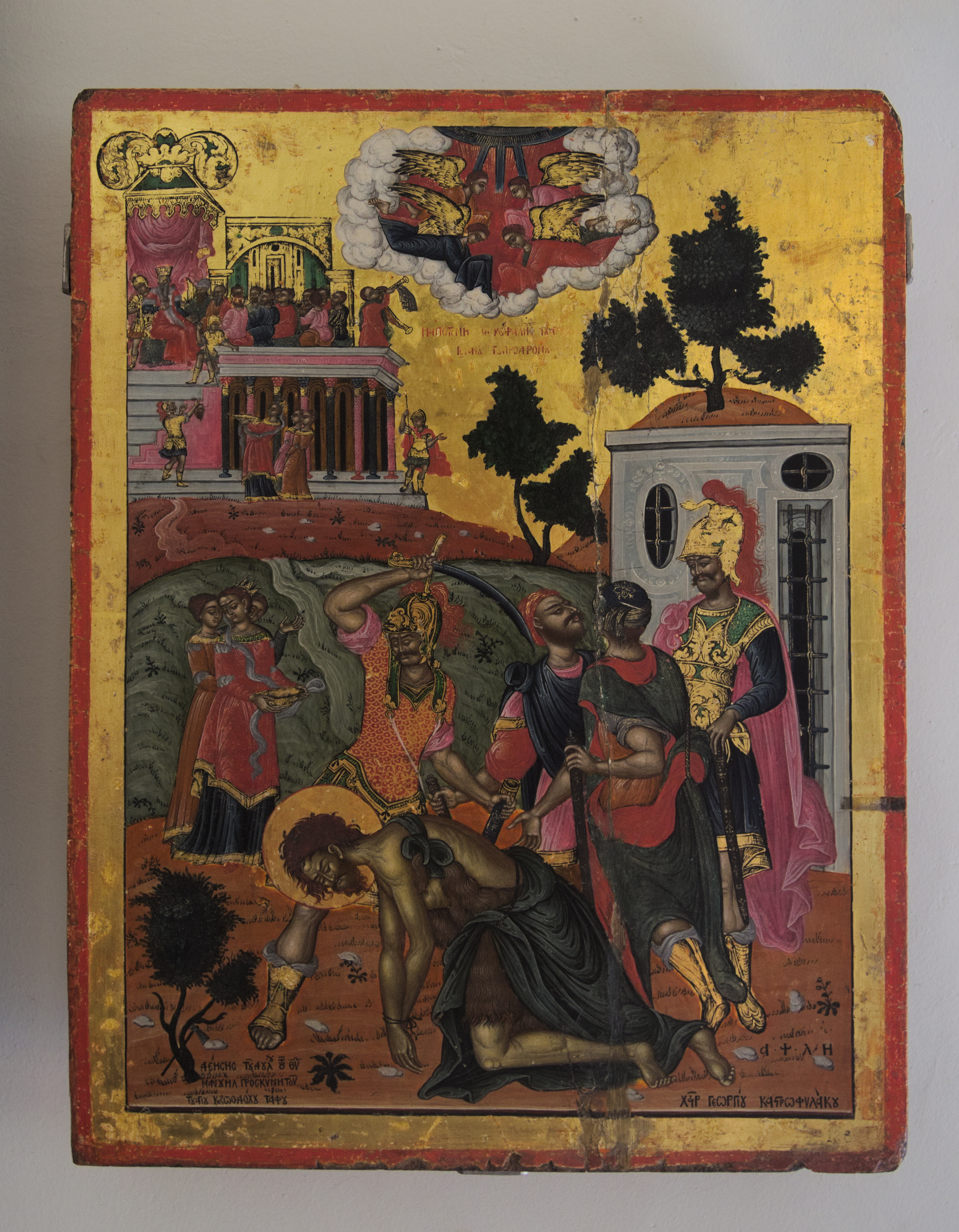
Beheading of John the Baptist

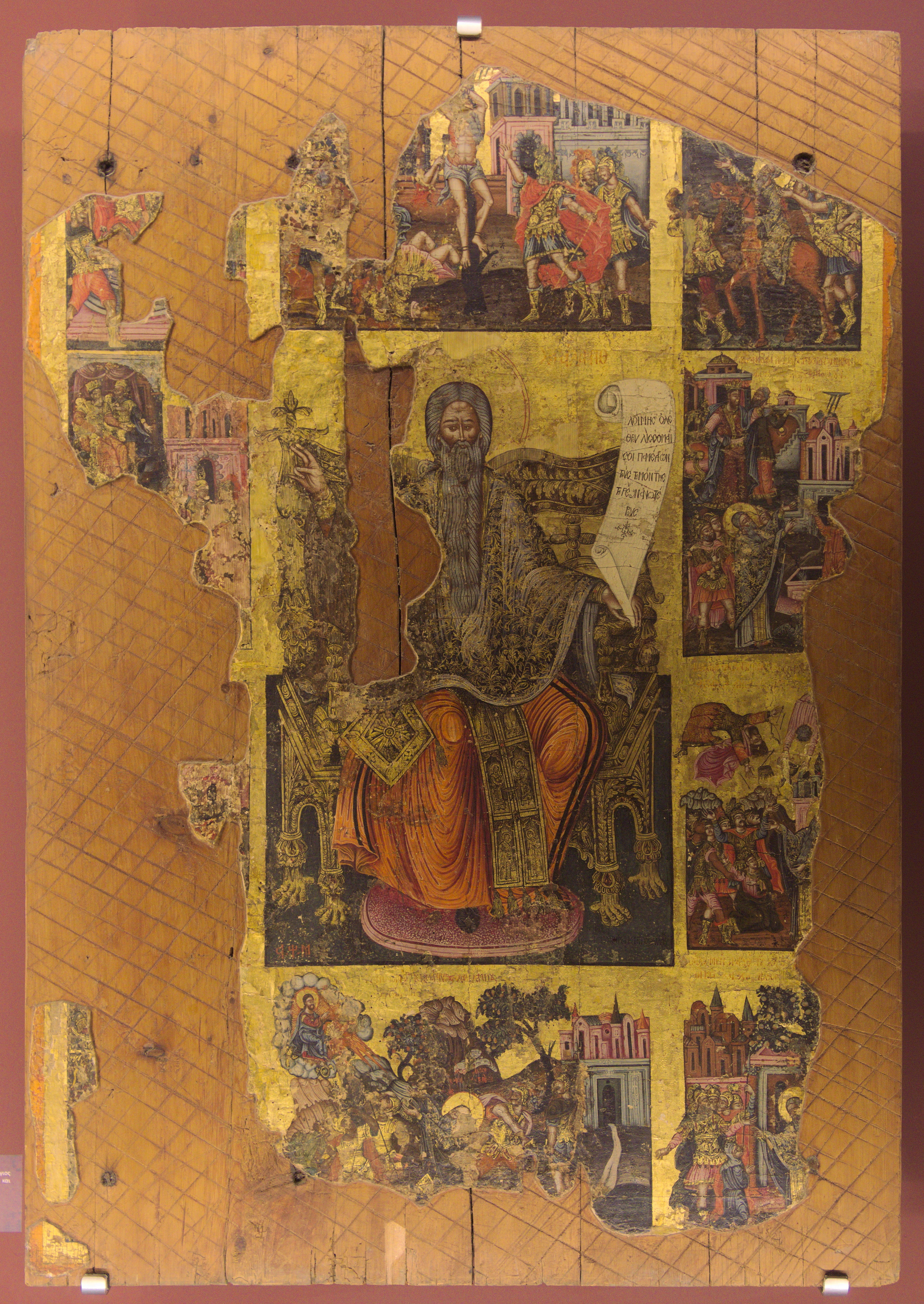
Saint Charalambos

== Bibliography ==
- Hatzidakis, Manolis (1987). Greek painters after the fall (1450-1830) Volume A. Athens, GR: Center for Modern Greek Studies E.I.E.
- Hatzidakis, Manolis & Drakopoulou, Eugenia (1997). Greek painters after the fall (1450-1830) Volume B. Athens, GR: Center for Modern Greek Studies E.I.E.
- Drakopoulou, Eugenia (2010). Greek painters after the fall (1450-1830) Volume C. Athens, GR: Center for Modern Greek Studies E.I.E.
