= Assumption of Mary (Doxaras) =

Painting by Nikolaos Doxaras

Assumption of the Virgin Mary
- Η Μετάσταση της Θεοτόκου (Greek), Assunzione di Maria (Italian)
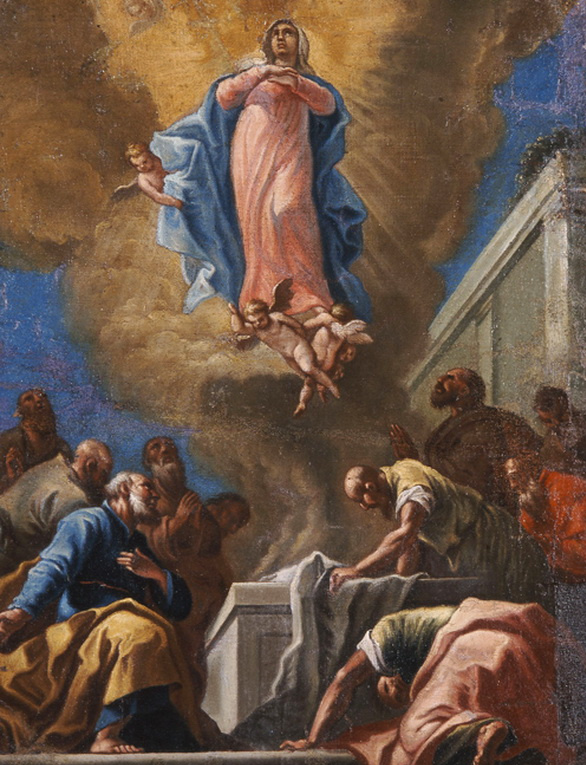
- Artist: Nikolaos Doxaras
- Year: 1725-1775
- Medium: oil on canvas
- Movement: Heptanese School
- Subject: Assumption of the Virgin Mary
- Dimensions: 45 cm × 34 cm (17.7 in × 13.3 in)
- Location: National Gallery of Athens, Corfu Annex; Corfu, Greece
- Owner: National Gallery of Athens
- Website: Official Website

Assumption of Mary was a painting created by Greek painter Nikolaos Doxaras. He was the son of famous Greek painter Panagiotis Doxaras. Nikolaos flourished on the Ionian Islands. He was a representative of the Heptanese School. He traveled all of the Ionian Islands painting. He spent close to a decade in Venice. He had a relationship with Johann Schulenberg. Doxaras stayed with him from 1730 to 1738 at the Palazzo Loredan. He was his confidant at the Schulenburg Art Gallery. He also painted for Schulenburg. He left Venice and continued painting all over the Ionian islands until his death. He was active from 1725 to 1775. Five of his paintings survived. Both Nikolaos and his father attempted to popularize oil painting.

There was an overwhelming demand by churches and patrons for the traditional Greek style paintings that overshadowed oil paintings few Greek artists such as El Greco were able to successfully maintain a workshop with an overwhelming output. The integration of Flemish engravings by artists of the Heptanese School made it even more difficult for oil painters and the style was not popular. Nicholas Doxaras and his father Panagiotis Doxaras attempted to integrate the new style but they were unsuccessful. Their contemporaries Emmanuel Tzanes and Theodore Poulakis each maintain a catalog of over 130 paintings. They painted in the Greek style popular at that period in time.

The Assumption of Mary is one of the most popular themes in Greek and Italian art from the inception of the new religion. The event is the death of the Virgin Mary. The theme was popular in Greek Italian Byzantine art. The theme also dominated Italian Renaissance painting. Precursors to Doxara's work included Titian, Tintoretto, and El Greco. The paintings usually feature the Virgin in the heavens looking down at her followers and witnesses. The work of art belongs to the National Gallery of Athens. It is currently on display at the Annex of the National Gallery in Corfu on the Ionian Islands.

== History ==
The work of art was created using oil paint and canvas. The height of the painting is: 45 cm (17.7 in) and the width is 34 cm (13.3 in). The painting bears similarities to Tintoretto's Assumption in both works angels hold up the Virgin Mary. A few of the bearded figures below also reflect Tintoretto's masterpiece. El Greco, Titian and Tintoretto's paintings all feature the Virgin in the same orientation. The Virgin Mary floats in the heavens. In the Doxaras, her heavenly robe levitates as an angel holds her garment. The painter's shadows ideally reflect deeper space and create adequate spatial depth. The clouds attempt to reflect an aura of divinity. To our right, the painter adds a complex structure to reflect a three-dimensional environment. The building features straight lines and ninety-degree angles. Towards the lower portion of the canvas. A group of ten witnesses partake in the heavenly event. The painter chose oil paint over the traditional tempera. The oil paint gave Doxaras more time to work with his canvas. Tempera is fast drying and requires soft hair and bristle strokes. The artist cannot use impasto. The blue color dominates the canvas. The geometric shape of the lower figure continues to illustrate deeper space. The garments were painted with adequate light and shadow to establish form and volume.

== Gallery ==
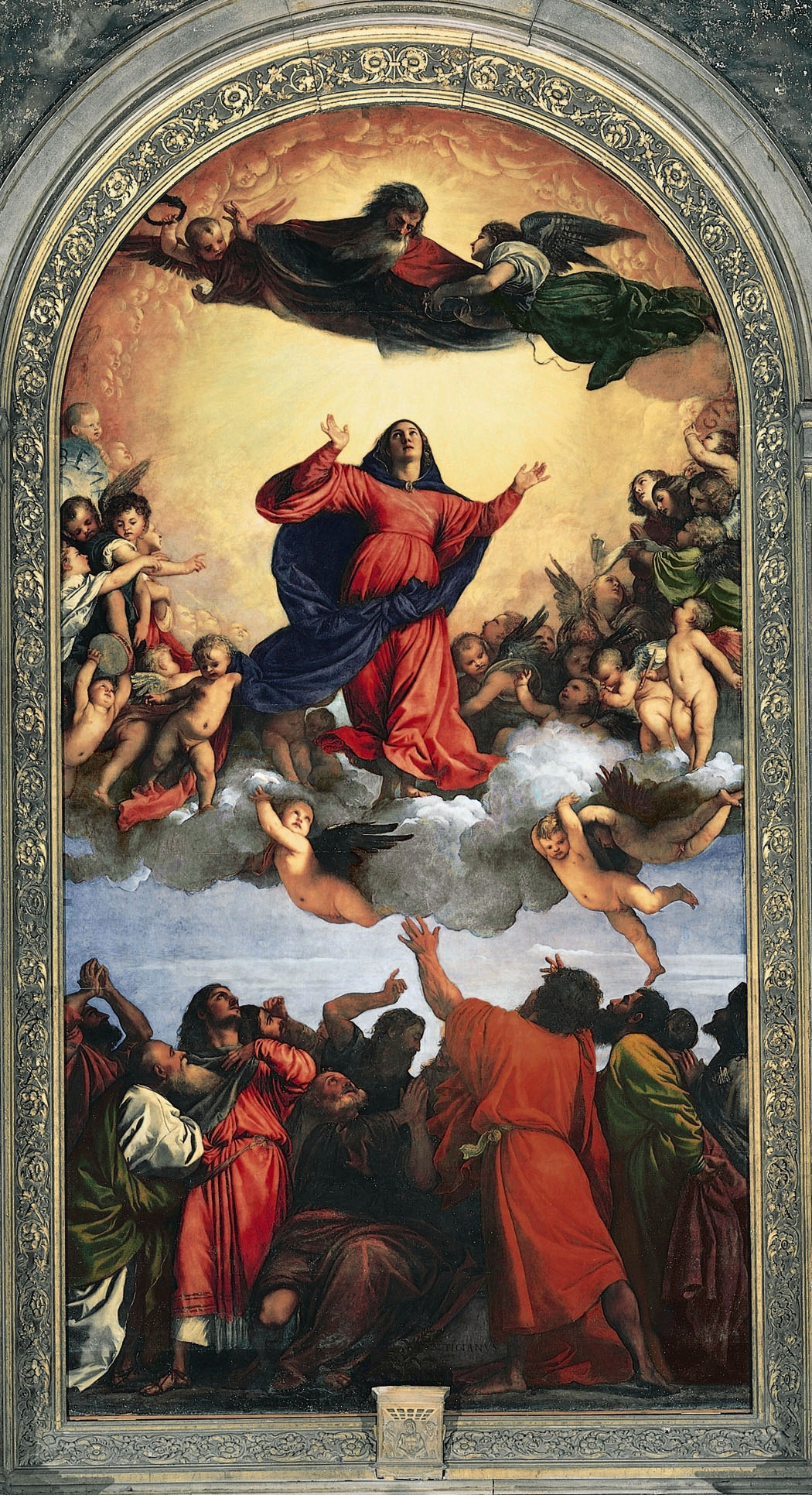
The Assumption Titian

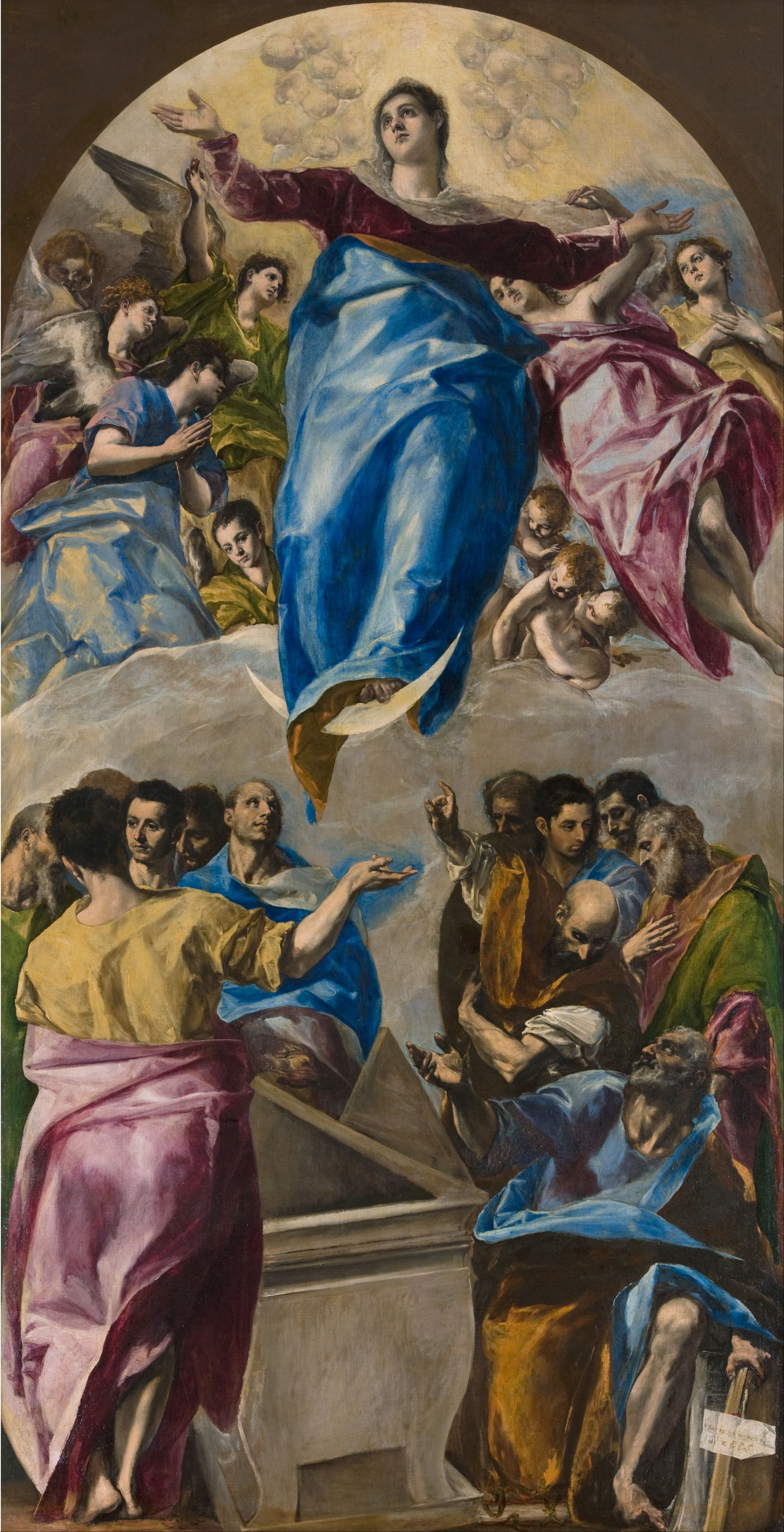
Assumption El Greco

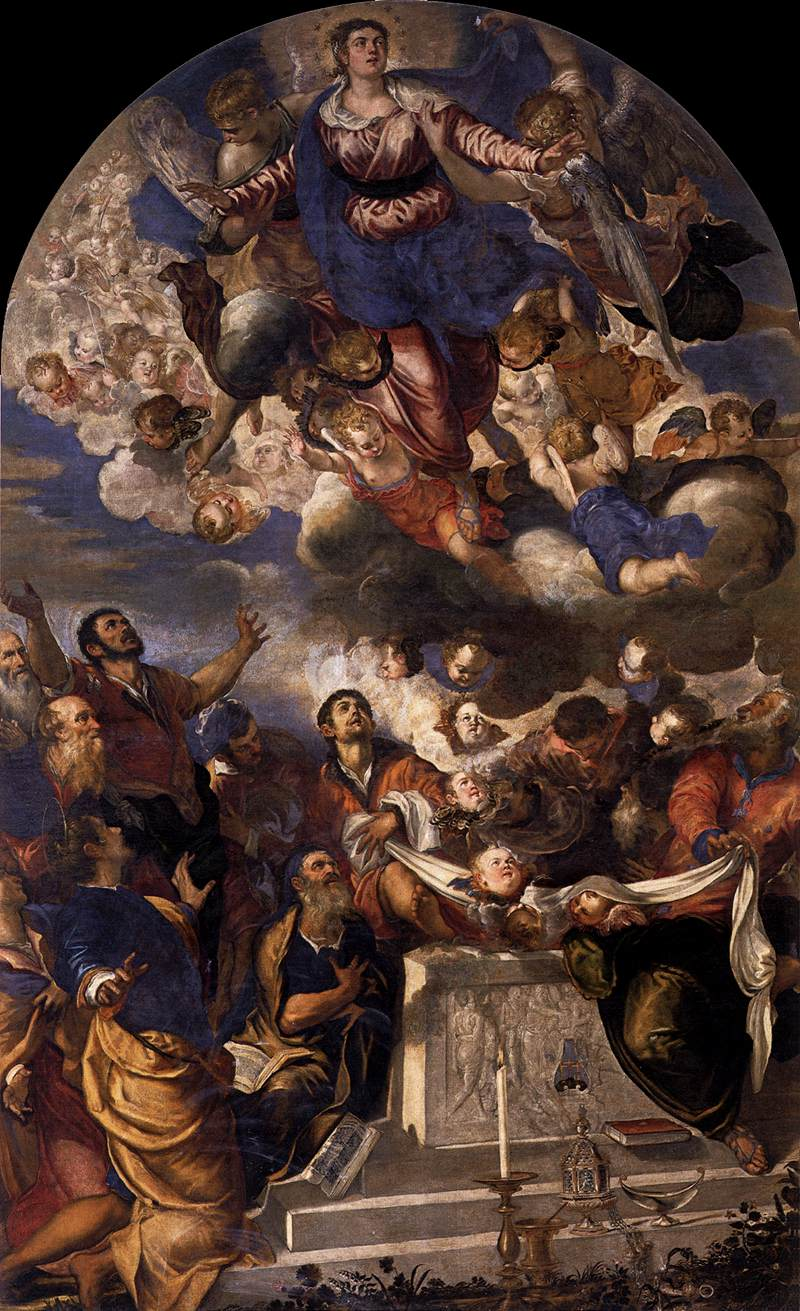
The Assumption Tintoretto
