= Spyridon Sperantzas =

Greek painter

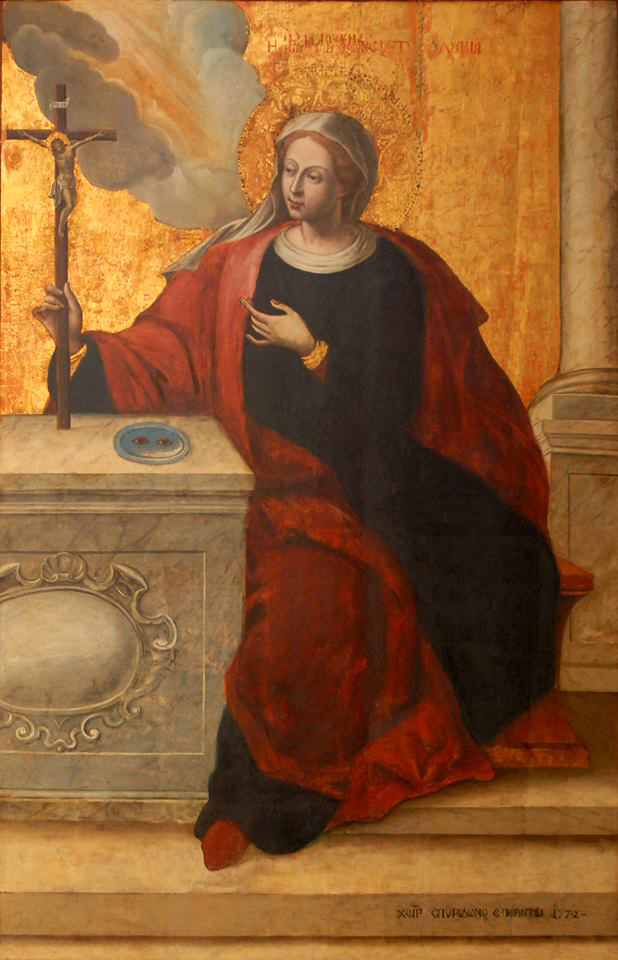
- Saint Lucy
- Born: 1733; Corfu, Greece
- Died: 1818 (aged 84–85); Trieste, Austrian Empire
- Movement: Heptanese School; Neoclassicism; Greek Romanticism
- Spouse: Diamantina
- Children: Michael Sperantzas

Spyridon Sperantzas (Greek: Σπυρίδων Σπεράντζας, 1733 – 1818) was a Greek painter. He flourished during the Greek Neoclassical era and the Modern Greek Enlightenment in art also known as Neo-Hellenikos Diafotismos. Because of the Fall of the Republic of Venice, Sperantzas brought the Heptanese School into the Greek Romantic period. By the 1800s the Ionian Islands were occupied by both French and English forces and for the first time since the fall of the Byzantine Empire, the local Greeks governed themselves. Sperantzas, Nikolaos Kantounis, and Nikolaos Koutouzis represent the transition in painting that defined Modern Greek art. Sperantzas was influenced by Nikolaos Kallergis, Nikolaos Doxaras, and Nikolaos Koutouzis. His son Michael Sperantzas was also a famous painter and his apprentice. Spyridon also painted frescos.

== History ==
Sperantzas was born in Corfu. He married Diamantina. His son Michael was a famous painter. Spyridon and his son Michael collaborated on several projects together. He is mentioned in records from 1763 to 1781. In 1765, he completed illustrations on the iconostasis in the church of the Saint's Antoniou and Andreas in the city of Corfu. In 1786, he was in the Italian city Trieste with his wife Diamantina.

According to archival documents of the Serbian community in Trieste. Spyridon and his son worked decorating the chapel of the Illyrian Cemetery. They also decorated the church of Agios Spyridon of Trieste during the period 1794–1796. He also painted the iconostasis of the Greek Orthodox Church of San Nicolò dei Greci. The family owned an ecclesiastical shop in Trieste.

His son Michael maintained a good relationship with the Greek church. He occasionally cleaned and maintained the icons. Spyridon’s grandson was also a painter. Spyridon died in the same city in 1818 at the age of 85 years old.

Sperantzas and his son Michael brought the refined art of Corfu and the Heptanese School to Trieste. He represented Greek Romanticism and Neoclassicism. He fortifies a stylistic transition in Greek art that evolved from the Cretan Renaissance to the Heptanese School. His art was influenced by the Greek Rocco which was defined by Panagiotis Doxaras and his son Nikolaos Doxaras. Greek art was influenced by the Venetian Style and later evolved due to the exposure of English, French, and Austrian cultures. According to the Institute of Neohellenic Research, thirty of his paintings have survived and three frescos.

== Gallery ==
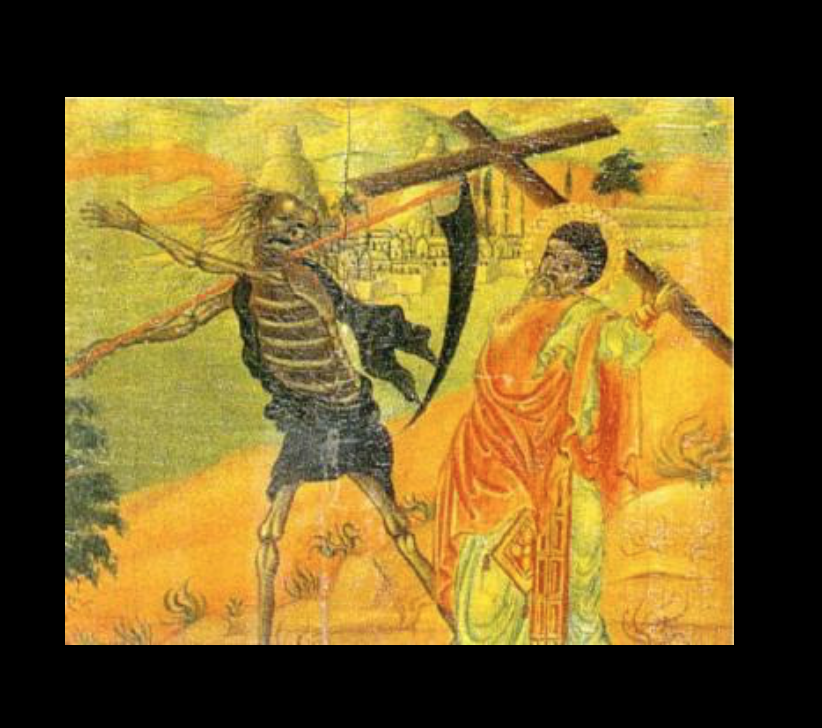
Skeleton

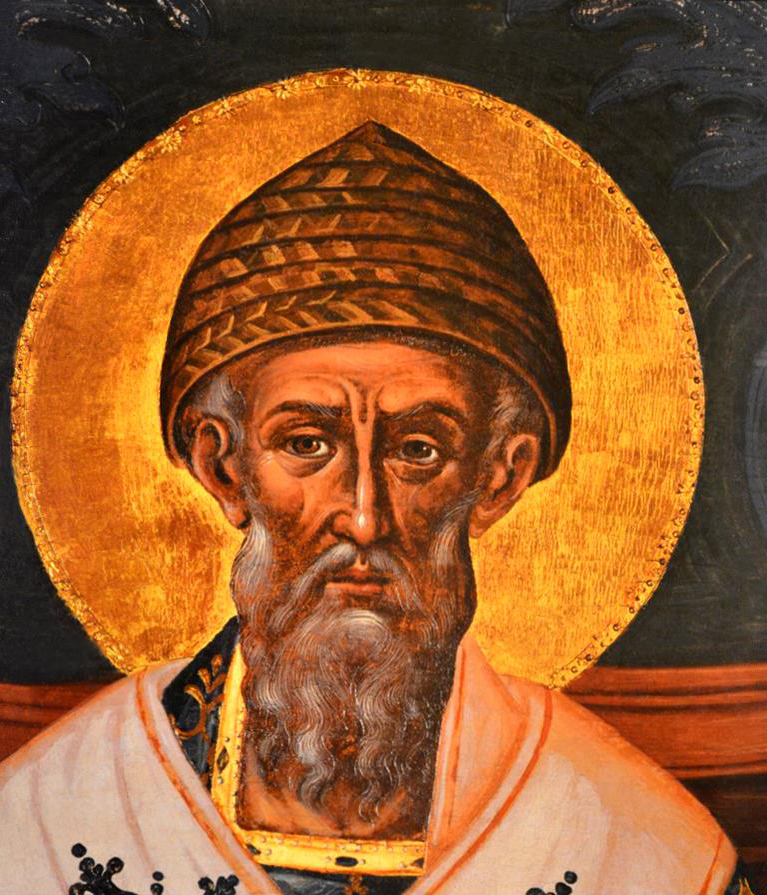
Saint Spyridon

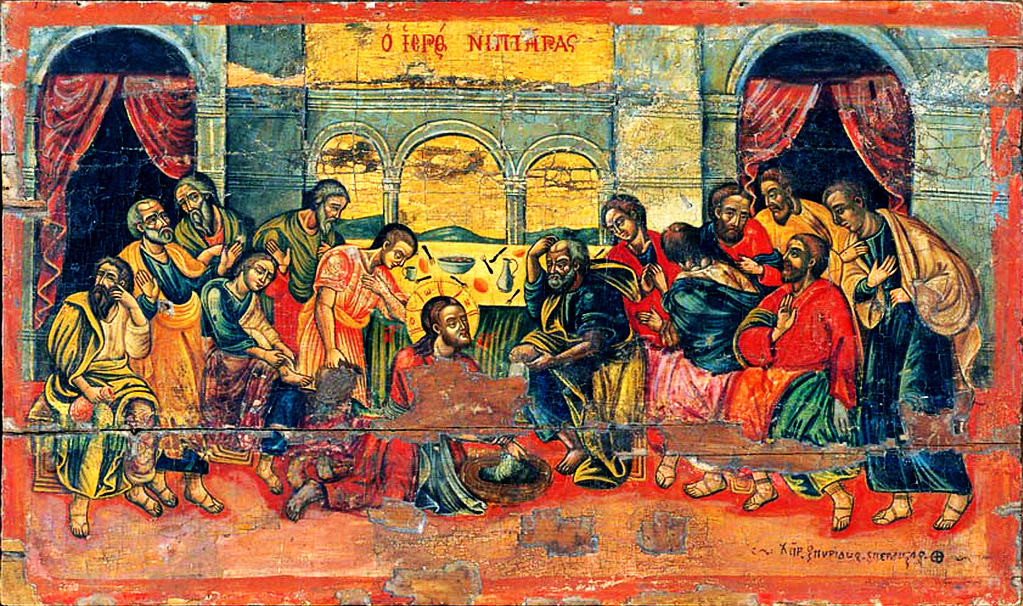
Christ Washing Feet

== Notable works ==
- Beheading of John the Baptist, 1756, Collection of the Neohellenic Institute Athens GR
- Fresco Church of Saint Eleutherius, Corfu Greece
- Fresco Church of Ypsilis Theotoko, Corfu Greece
- Fresco Church of Agios Ioannis Prodromou, Corfu Greece

== Bibliography ==
- Hatzidakis, Manolis (1987). Greek painters after the fall (1450-1830) Volume A. Athens, GR: Center for Modern Greek Studies E.I.E.
- Hatzidakis, Manolis & Drakopoulou, Eugenia (1997). Greek painters after the fall (1450-1830) Volume B. Athens, GR: Center for Modern Greek Studies E.I.E.
- Drakopoulou, Eugenia (2010). Greek painters after the fall (1450-1830) Volume C. Athens, GR: Center for Modern Greek Studies E.I.E.
