= The Holy Family (Doxaras) =

Painting by Panagiotis Doxaras

- Η Αγία Οικογένεια (Greek), Sacra Famiglia (Italian)
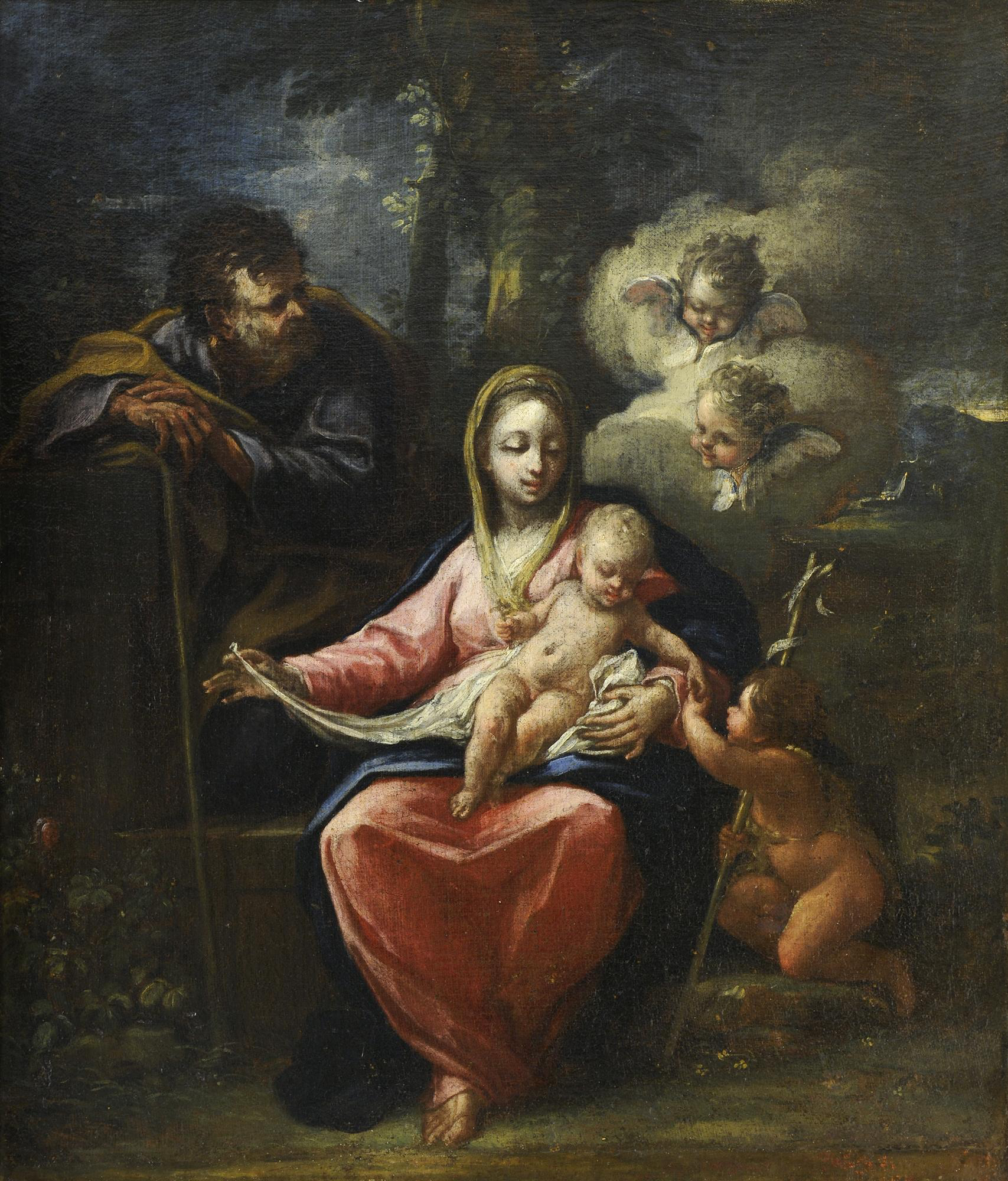
- Artist: Panagiotis Doxaras
- Year: 1700
- Medium: oil on canvas
- Movement: Heptanese School
- Subject: Joseph, Virgin Mary, Christ Child, and John the Baptist with angels
- Dimensions: 70.1 cm × 58.9 cm (27.6 in × 23.2 in)
- Location: National Gallery of Athens; Athens, Greece
- Owner: National Gallery of Athens
- Accession: K.866
- Website: Official Website

The Holy Family is an oil painting created by Greek painter Panagiotis Doxaras. He was a prominent member of the Heptanese School. He was also an author. His son Nikolaos Doxaras was also a famous painter. Panayiotis was from a small village named Koutifari, close to Kalamata. He moved to Zakynthos at a young age. He studied painting with famous painter Leos Moskos. He traveled all over the Venetian empire with the famous artist including Venice. He studied painting in Venice for five years. He became a theoretical painter. He wrote several books on painting. He traveled all over the Ionian Islands. He lived in Lefkada, Zakynthos, and Corfu. He frescoed the ceiling of Panagia Faniromeni in Zakynthos. Eighteen of his paintings survived.

Panagiotis successfully introduced oil painting into the Greek style. Greek patrons rejected Renaissance-style paintings such as the works of Titian, Tintoretto, and El Greco. Most of the patrons were Greek churches that preferred the Greek style or maniera greca. Italian and Greek patrons also supported the old style. Some of Panayioti's works resemble the Byzantine-influenced Cretan School mixed with the early Heptanese school. He was not successfully able to introduce Renaissance-style paintings but the artist began to introduce slower drying oil paint replacing egg tempera. He was also able to resemble Michael Damaskinos in creating a new movement for Greek painters to follow.

The Holy Family is a topic used by countless Greek and Italian painters. Venetian masters such as Titian and Tintoretto painted versions of the Holy Family. El Greco also covered the subject matter in several of his pieces. Historians agree that some paintings are a depiction of the family resting on the flight into egypt. Panayioti's studied countless paintings. He translated Trattato de la pittura de Leonardo da Vinci. He was an admirer of Leonardo da Vinci. His work is a mixture of Leonardo da Vinci and Raphael's Holy Family paintings. Panagioti's was also influenced by the works of Rutilio di Lorenzo Manetti. Although Doxara's Italian Renaissance-style paintings were not as popular as his Greek-style works. The artist's painting style and theories were appreciated during the Modern Greek art movement in the 19th century. His masterpiece is part of the collection of the National Gallery of Athens in Greece.

== Description ==
The painter chose to use oil paint on canvas. The height of the work is 70.1 cm (27.6 in.) and the width is 58.9 cm (23.2 in.). The traditional holy family is depicted Joseph, the Virgin Mary, the Christ Child, and John the Baptist appear with two angels. The painter utilized the chiaroscuro technique. The central figures are illuminated while Joseph observes the children playing from the middle ground. Two angelic children appear from the clouds. They are part of the illuminated group of subjects. John the Baptist's face is brighter than the rest of his body. All four child-like figures relay innocence. The artist had a firm understanding of light and shadow. Dark blue is the dominant color of the work. The Madonna figure sits on a wooden crate her expression is charismatic and innocent while she watches the children play. The figure exposes similarities to several of Manetti's works. She is glowing with joy as a gold scarf rests over her head. The Christ Child rests on a holy shroud. He peers at his cousin John the Baptist while they touch hands. His child-like innocence is revealed in his small face. Doxaras mastered flesh tones. The Christ Child features yellowish pink or pinkish cream coloration. He has blonde hair. His stomach and legs are clearly accentuated with shadows. His belly button is also visible. The child John the Baptist holds his traditional staff wrapped with a scroll. His face relays the same innocent charm as the Christ Child. To our right, behind the two angels, mountains appear in the background.

== Gallery ==
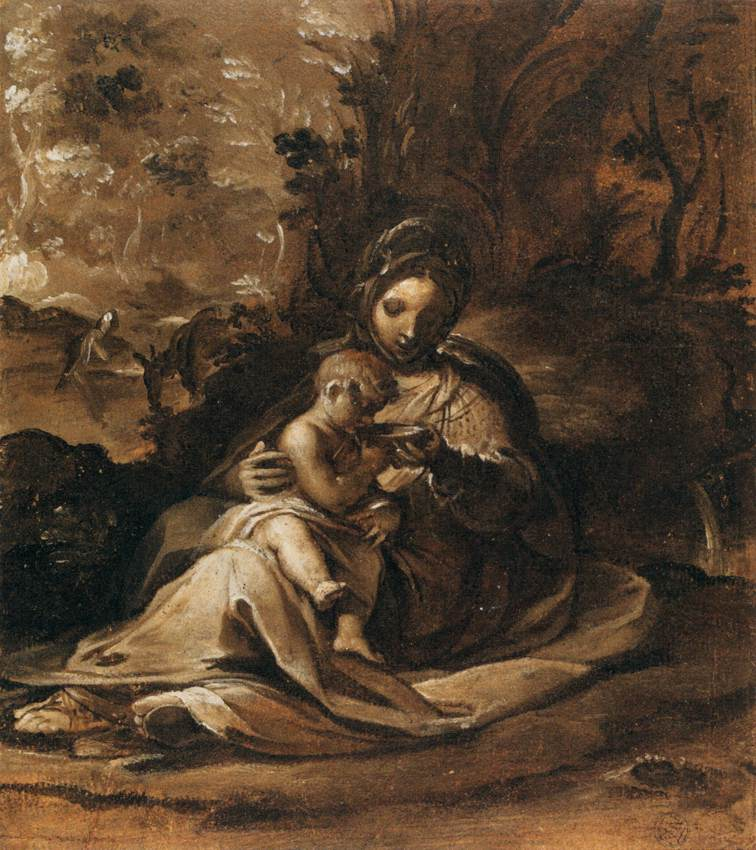
Rest on the Flight into Egypt Manetti

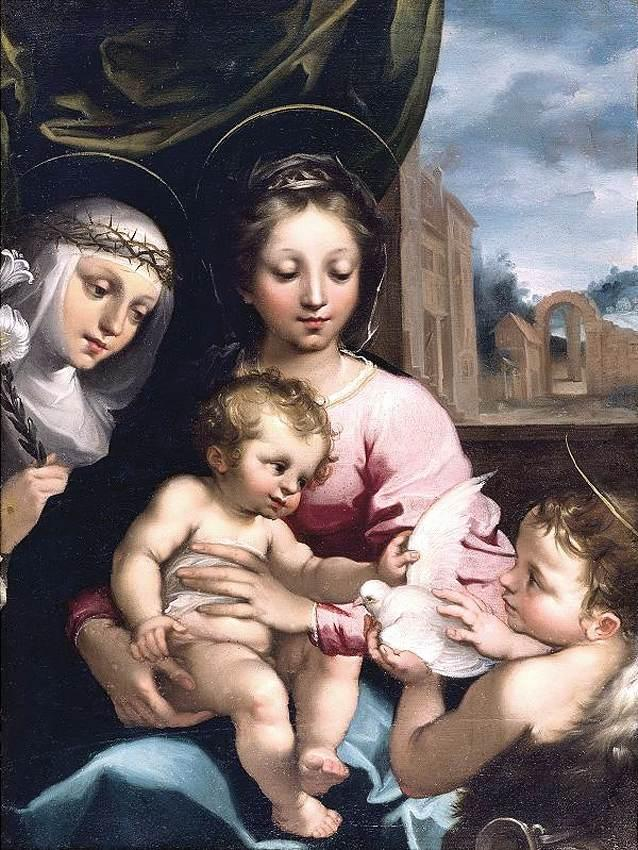
Madonna and Child Manetti

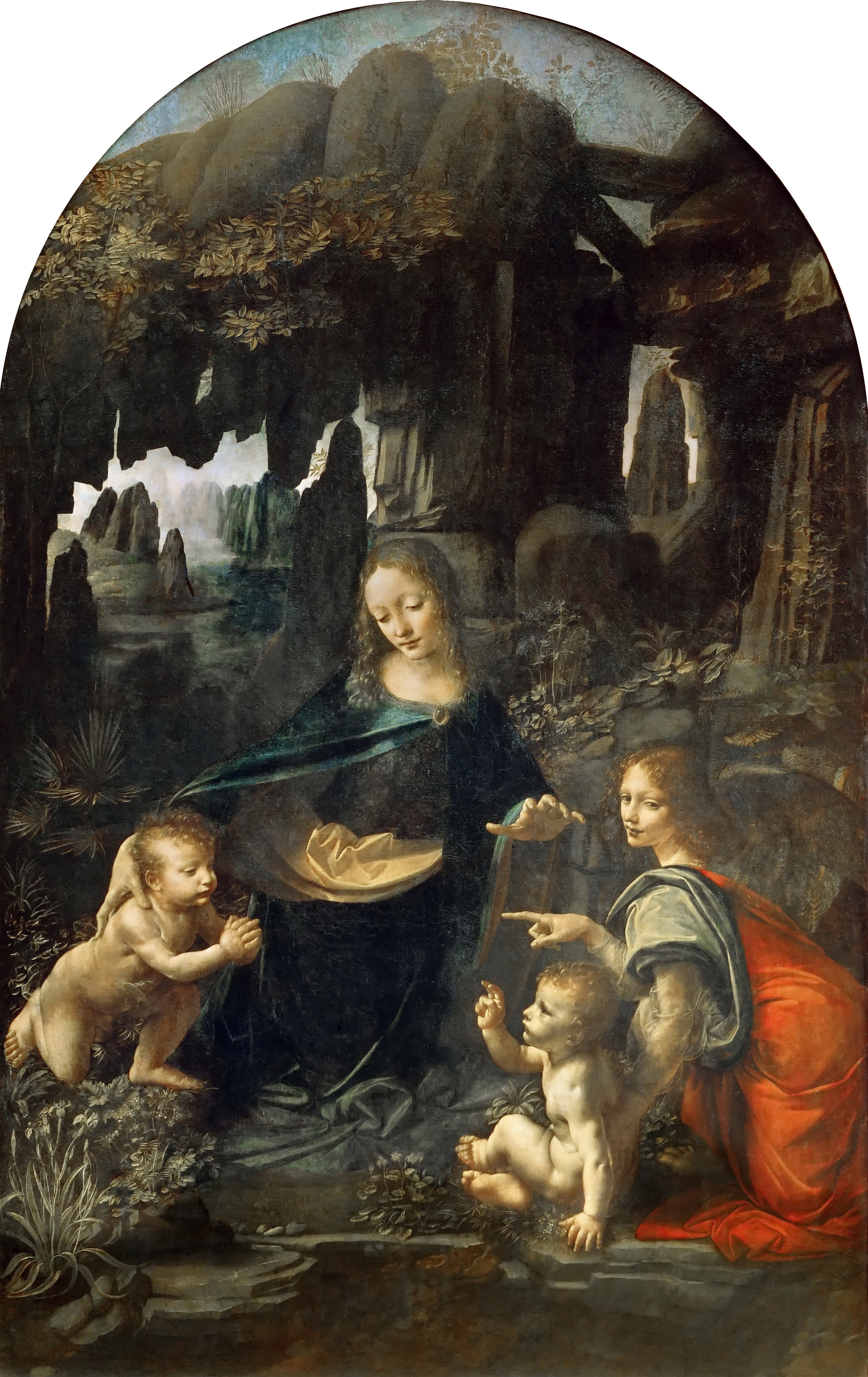
The Holy Family Da Vinci

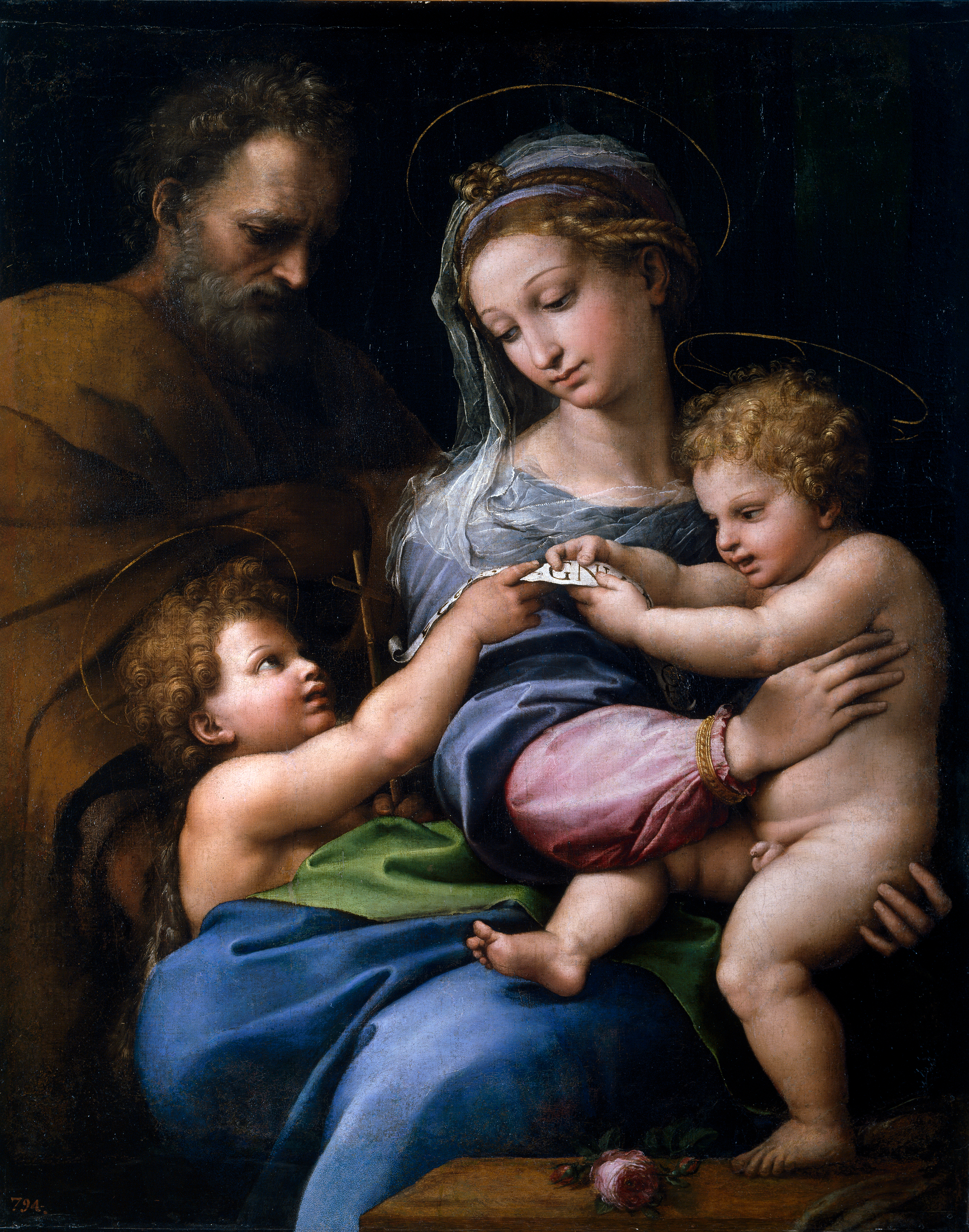
Madonna della Rosa Raphael

== See also ==
- Francesco Vanni

== Bibliography ==
- Drakopoulou, Evgenia (2010). Έλληνες Ζωγράφοι μετά την Άλωση (1450–1830). Τόμος 3: Αβέρκιος - Ιωσήφ [Greek Painters after the Fall of Constantinople (1450–1830). Volume 3: Averkios - Joseph]. Athens, Greece: Center for Modern Greek Studies, National Research Foundation. ISBN 978-960-7916-94-5.
- Speake, Graham (2021). Encyclopedia of Greece and the Hellenic Tradition. London And New York: Rutledge Taylor & Francis Group. ISBN 9781135942069.
