= Self-portrait with Psalter =

Painting by Nikolaos Koutouzis

- Αυτοπροσωπογραφία με Ψαλτήρι (Greek), Autoritratto Con Salterio (liturgia) (Italian)
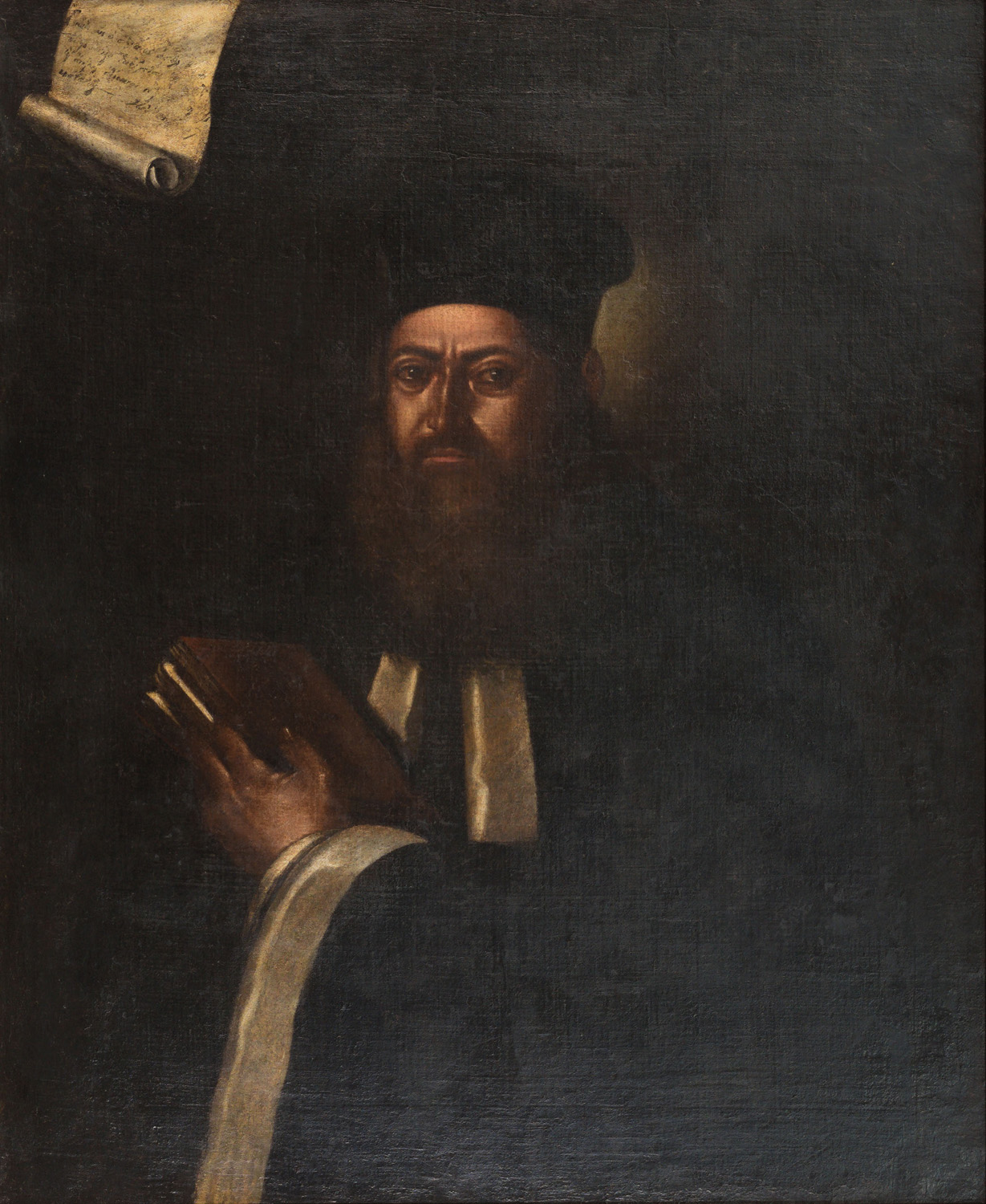
- Artist: Nikolaos Koutouzis
- Year: 1761 - 1813
- Medium: oil on canvas
- Movement: Heptanese School; Romanticism
- Subject: Nikolaos Koutouzis with Psalter
- Dimensions: 94 cm × 77 cm (37 in × 30.3 in)
- Location: Solomos Museum; Zakynthos, Greece
- Owner: Solomos Museum

Self-portrait with Psalter is an oil painting created by Nikolaos Koutouzis. The work was completed between 1761 and 1813. Koutouzis was a member of the Heptanese School of painting. He was also a priest and poet. There are over 136 paintings attributed to him, of which fifteen were portraits. At some point in his life, Koutouzis was involved in a brawl, and his face was permanently scarred. Koutouzis' teachers included Nikolaos Doxaras and Giovanni Battista Tiepolo. Both artists completed some portraits throughout their artistic careers. Koutouzis lived in Venice from 1760-1765, studying at the workshop of Tiepolo. Koutouzis later became a teacher and taught Nikolaos Kantounis, who also completed portraits.

The Cretan and Heptanese Schools were saturated with painters and paintings of theological subject matter, but did not feature many portraits. El Greco was one of the few members of the Cretan School who completed portraits. His existing portrait catalog is about thirty-five works. The Heptanese School featured a plethora of portrait painters after the midpoint of the 1700s, including Doxaras, Ventouras, Koutouzis, Kantounis, and Pitsamanos. Ventouras completed a notable portrait of Ali Pasha along with five other portraits. Koutouzis completed several self-portraits. Self-portrait with Psalter was purchased in 2021 for 26,910 euros by Greek ship owner Thanasis Martinos. It was donated to the Solomos Museum in Zakynthos, Greece.

== Description ==
The painting is made with oil paint on canvas. The height of the work is 94 cm (37 in), while the width is 77 cm (30.3 in). The work was completed sometime between 1761 and 1813 during the Romantic period. The painting's somber and somewhat mysterious mood is attributed to the artist's use of dark colors. Koutouzis implemented the traditional chiaroscuro technique to highlight areas of the self-portrait. A similar technique was used by his teacher, Giovanni Battista Tiepolo, in his work entitled Portrait of an Old Man. Koutouzis added a light behind his head to accentuate the silhouette of the kalimavkion. A similar method was used by his student Kantounis in the Chemist Nikopoulos. In his hand, Koutouzis holds a religious book known as a Psalter. A scroll is visible in the upper left corner of the image, radiating with light. Koutouzis is wearing a black vestment decorated with gold trim, and he is weeping. Weeping is a traditional characteristic in theological paintings and is a common characteristic of Romanticism. The artist completed another self-portrait later in his life.

== Gallery ==
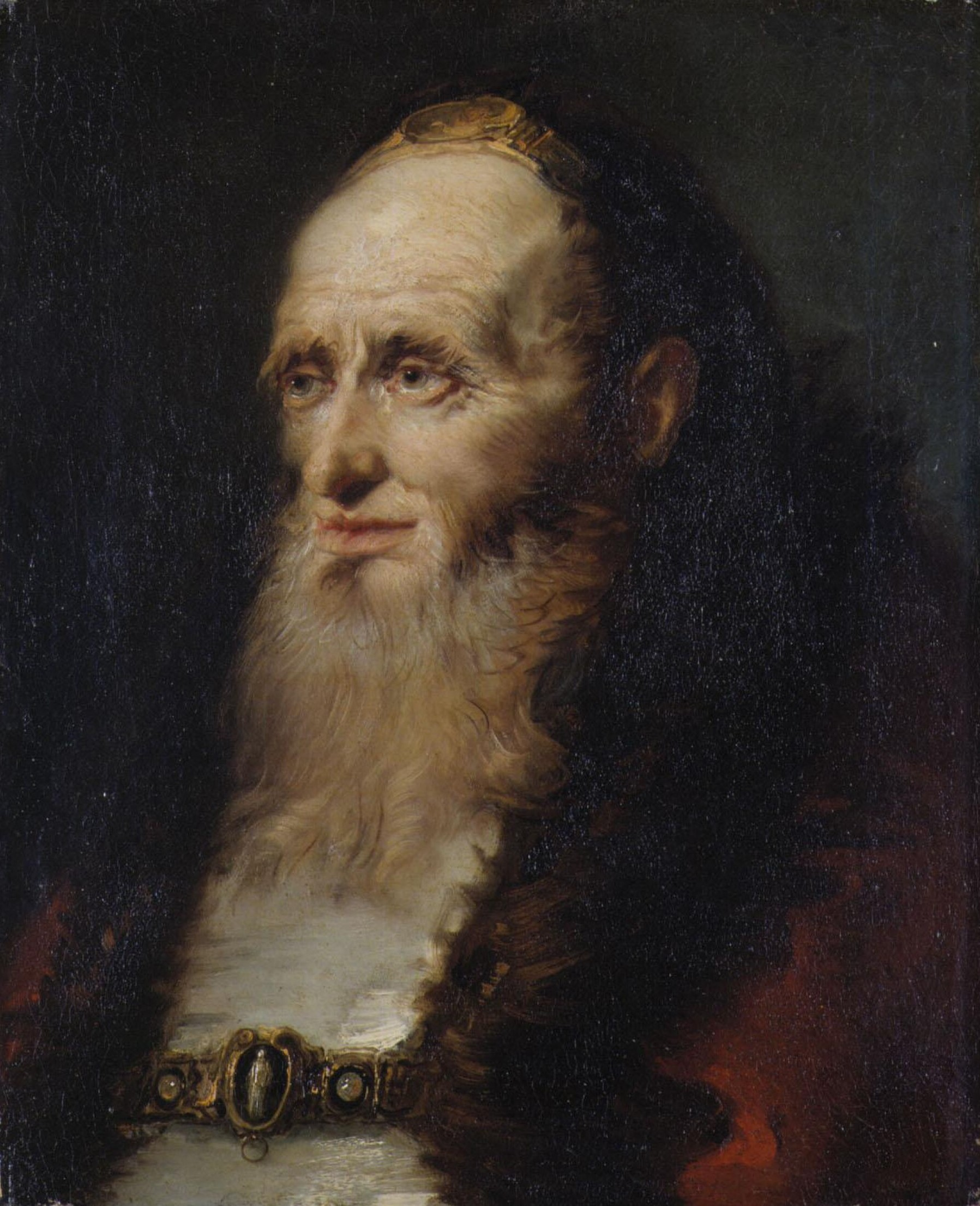
Portrait of an Old Man by Giovanni Battista Tiepolo

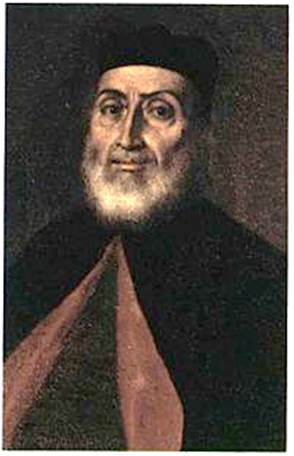
Self Portrait by Koutouzis

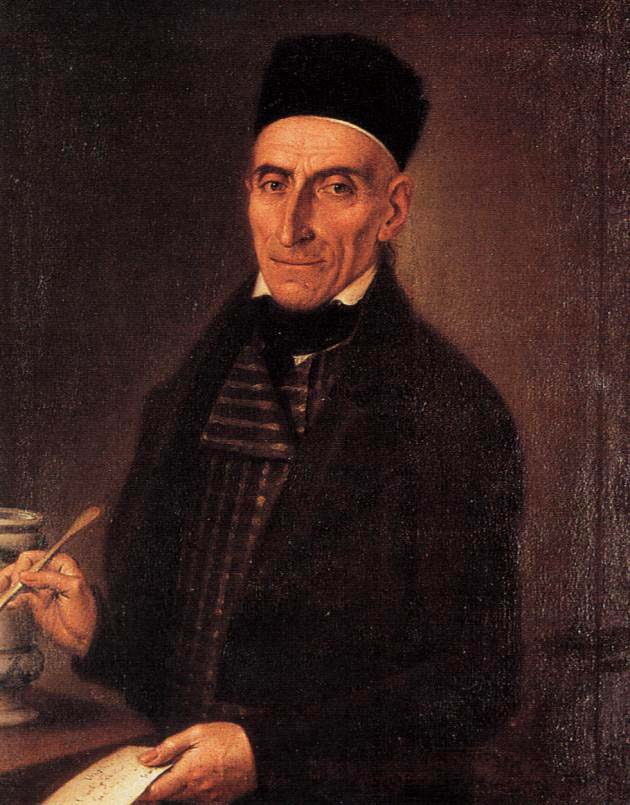
Chemist Nikopoulos by Nikolaos Kantounis

== Bibliography ==
- Hatzidakis, Manolis; Drakopoulou, Evgenia (1997). Έλληνες Ζωγράφοι μετά την Άλωση (1450–1830). Τόμος 2: Καβαλλάρος – Ψαθόπουλος [Greek Painters after the Fall of Constantinople (1450–1830). Volume 2: Kavallaros – Psathopoulos]. Athens: Center for Modern Greek Studies, National Research Foundation. hdl:10442/14088. ISBN 960-7916-00-X.
