= Saint Spyridon, John the Baptist, Saint Peter, and Saint George (Koutouzis) =

Painting by Nikolaos Koutouzis

Saint Spyridon, John the Baptist, Saint Peter and Saint George
- Άγιος Σπυρίδων, Άγιος Ιωάννης ο Πρόδρομος, Άγιος Πέτρος και Άγιος Γεώργιος (Greek), San Spiridione, San Giovanni Battista, San Pietro e San Giorgio (Italian)
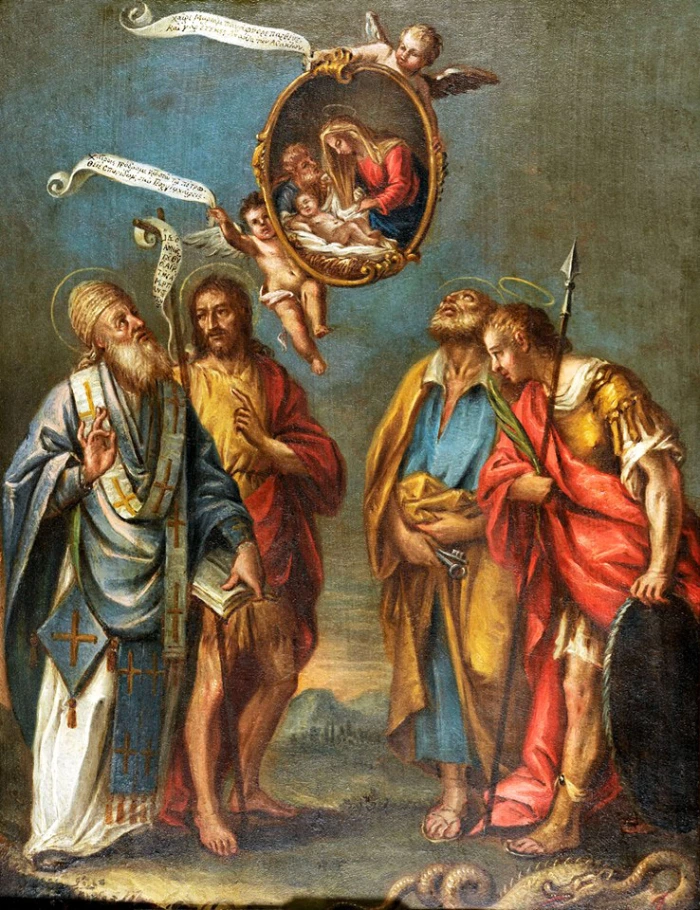
- Artist: Nikolaos Koutouzis
- Year: 1750 - 1813
- Medium: oil on canvas
- Movement: Heptanese School
- Subject: Saint Spyridon, Saint John the Baptist, Saint Peter and Saint George
- Dimensions: 56 cm × 43 cm (22 in × 16.9 in)
- Location: National Gallery of Athens, Corfu Annex; Corfu, Greece
- Owner: National Gallery of Athens
- Accession: Κ.860
- Website: Official Website

Saint Spyridon, John the Baptist, Saint Peter and Saint George is an oil painting created by Greek painter Nikolaos Koutouzis. He was a prominent member of the Heptanese School of painting. He was from the island of Zakynthos. He studied with Nikolaos Doxaras and Giovanni Tiepolo. He was an active painter for over fifty years. One hundred and thirty-six paintings are attributed to the artist. He was active from 1750 to 1813.

In the Greek world. Greek-style paintings were more popular than Italian-style paintings El Greco was the only major Greek painter to succeed at painting a genre outside of the traditional Greek style. Two of the most prominent painters who successfully changed the predictive norm were Nikolaos Koutouzis and Nikolaos Kantounis. Each painter has a catalogue of over one hundred works. Both painters successfully acquired patrons for portraits.

A saint is a person recognized as exhibiting a significant degree of divinity and closeness to God. Some churches officially canonize people worthy of public veneration. Greek and Italian painters have featured saints in their works since the inception of the new religion. The most featured saint was John the Baptist. Some painters painted more than one saint typically with Jesus or the Virgin Mary and or both. Saint Peter was frequently featured often holding the Keys of Heaven. Italian painter Guido Reni painted a notable version of four saints in the same position as Koutouzi's work. Both works feature similar landscapes but different saints. Another notable work that strongly resembles Koutouzi's painting was supposedly completed in the early 1700s. The artist is unknown. The unknown work may have been completed by Koutouzi. Koutouzi's painting is located at the National Gallery of Corfu on the Ionian Islands in Corfu, Greece.

== Description ==
The work of art was made of oil paint and canvas. The height is 56.1 cm (22.1 in.) and the width is 42.9 cm (16.9 in.). From left to right Starting from our left Saint Spyridon is looking up. He holds a sacred book in his left hand and with his right-hand does the sign of the cross. He is wearing a traditional vestment and stole. He is also wearing his traditional hat. John the Baptist assumes his typical form. The figure is humble. He is pointing up while looking at Saint Spyridon. Reni's work also features John the Baptist pointing up. In the Koutouzi he holds his sceptre. It is wrapped with a scroll containing Greek writing. Artists of the Heptanese school focused on human anatomy. John the Baptist's legs feature muscularity exhibiting contours and grooves. The artist appreciated the human anatomical aesthetic. Saint Peter is looking up. He holds the Keys of Heaven. He has an expression of awe on his face. The final figure on our right is Saint George. Saint George's expression emits humility while he stands next to an exquisitely painted dragon. He holds a spear, shield and the sacred palm branch. Saints have been painted holding the palm branch since the dawn of the Christian religion. The gold color is dominant. The artist chose oil paint over the fast-drying tempera paint. The artist added careful details to his figures. The garments feature a complex shadowing style. Each figure has a simple halo around their heads. Above the four figures. The Virgin Mary, Christ Child, and Joseph are all within an oval Rococo-styled frame grasped by two floating child-like angels. Both angels hold scrolls with Greek inscriptions.

== Gallery ==
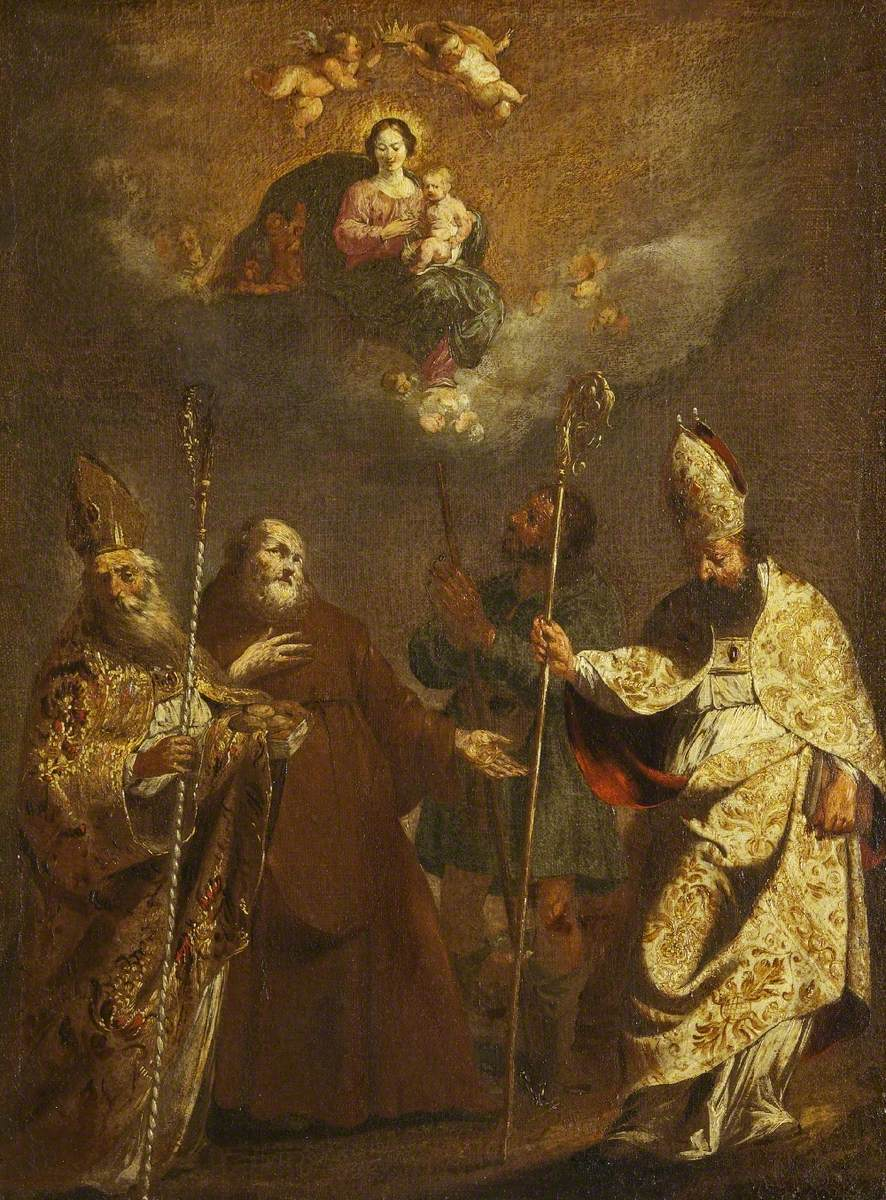
Similar work by Unknown Painter

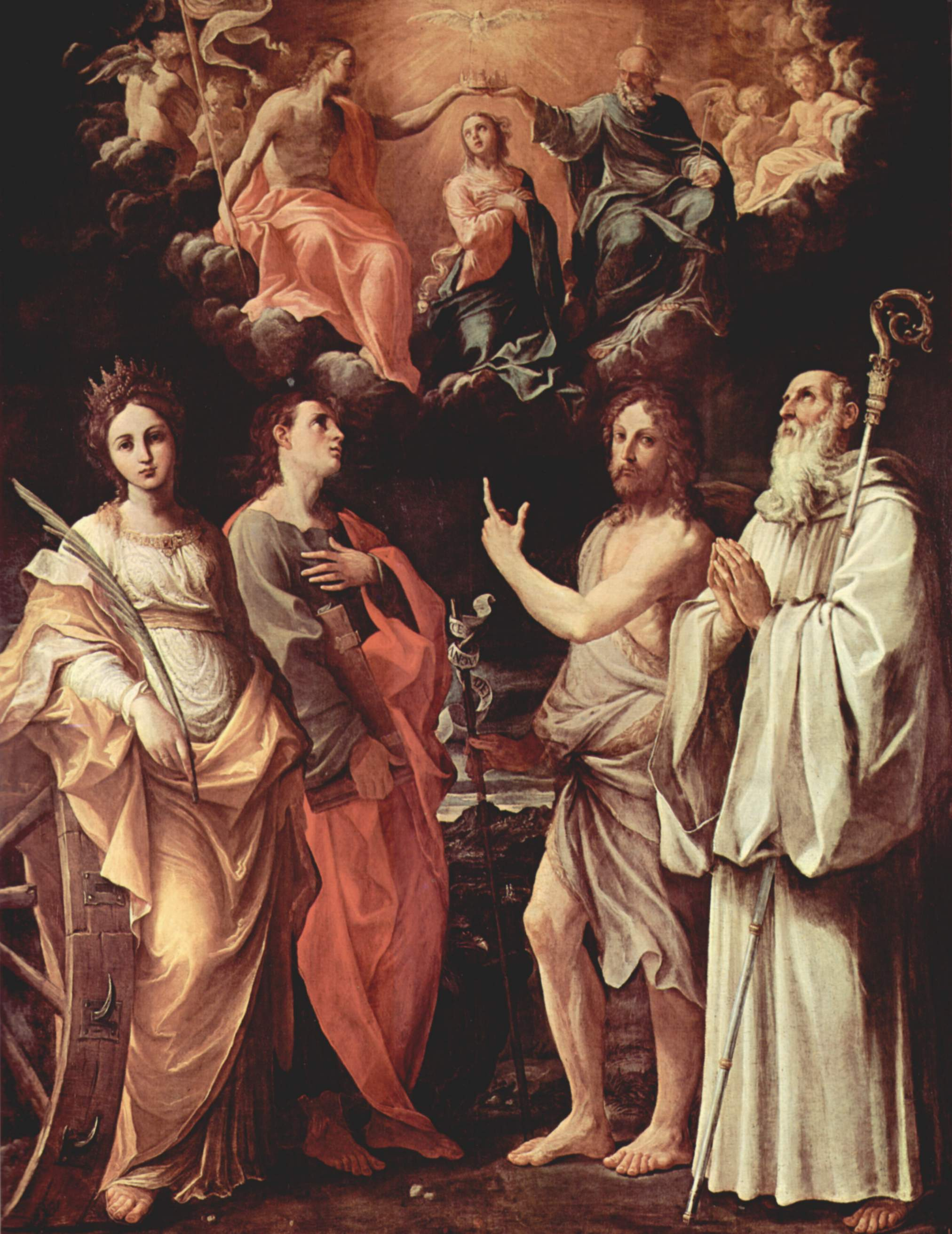
Coronation of Mary w/ Saints Guido Reni

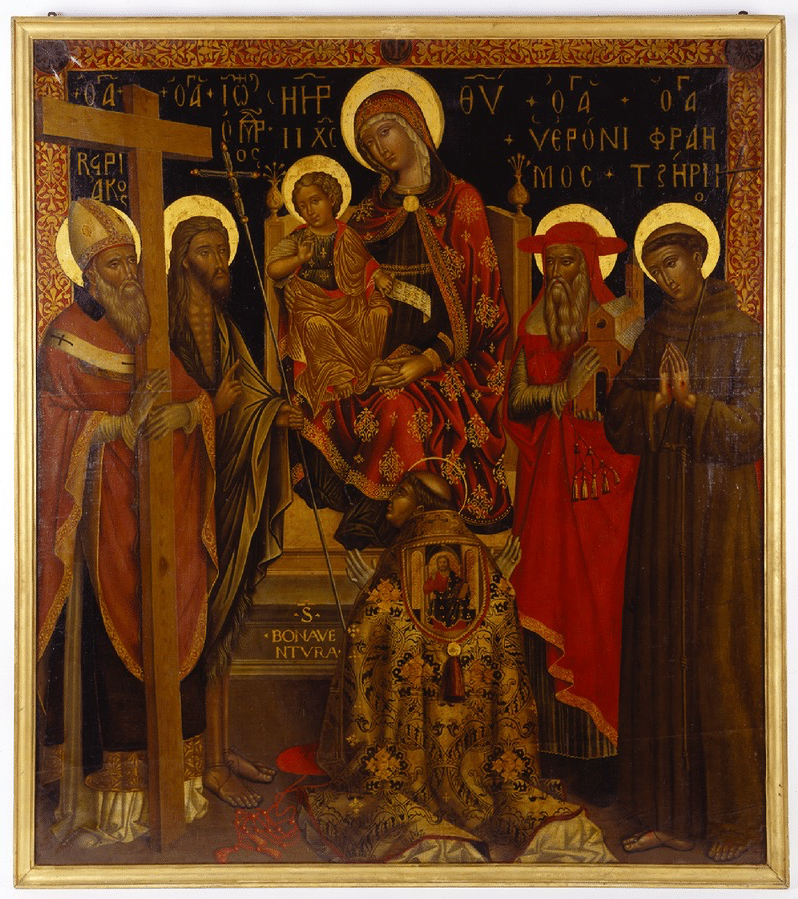
Traditional Saints Pitzamanos

== Bibliography ==
- Hatzidakis, Manolis; Drakopoulou, Evgenia (1997). Έλληνες Ζωγράφοι μετά την Άλωση (1450–1830). Τόμος 2: Καβαλλάρος – Ψαθόπουλος [Greek Painters after the Fall of Constantinople (1450–1830). Volume 2: Kavallaros – Psathopoulos]. Athens: Center for Modern Greek Studies, National Research Foundation. hdl:10442/14088. ISBN 960-7916-00-X.
