= Panagiotis Doxaras =

Greek painter (1662–1729)

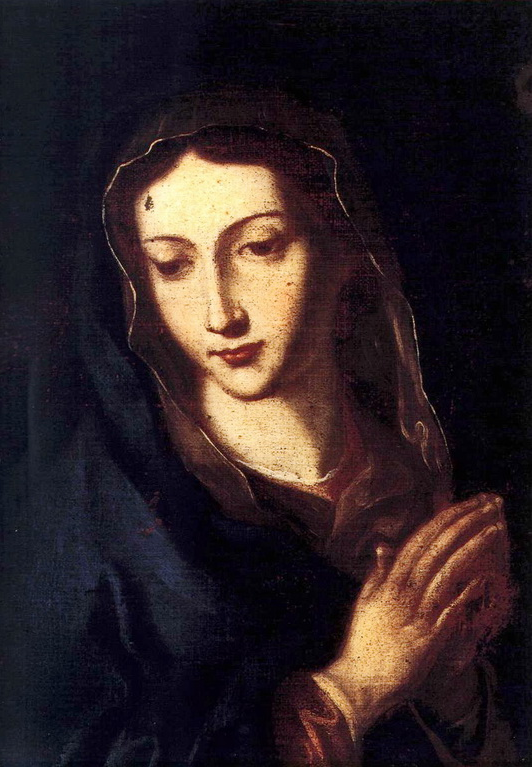
- Painting of the Virgin Mary by Panagiotis
- Born: 1662; Mani
- Died: 1729; Corfu, Republic of Venice (now Greece)
- Movement: Greek Rocco; Heptanese school
- Spouse: Bon family
- Children: Nikolaos Doxaras; Demetrios Doxaras
- Patron(s): Johann Schulenburg

Panagiotis Doxaras (Greek: Παναγιώτης Δοξαράς; 1662–1729), also known as Panayiotis Doxaras, was an author and painter. He was a prolific member of the Heptanese school. He was influenced by early members of the movement namely: Elias Moskos, Theodoros Poulakis, Stephanos Tzangarolas, Spyridon Sperantzas and Victor. The Heptanese school evolved during the Baroque period and continued into the Late Baroque or Rococo. Doxaras's son Nikolaos Doxaras continued the artistic movement into the Neoclassical era. Both Panagiotis and his son Nikolaos refined the school. The school was heavily influenced by the Venetian style. The Heptanese school also influenced Italian painting. Other artists Doxaras influenced were Nikolaos Kantounis. Panagioti's teacher was the famous painter Leos Moskos. whom he studied with while he was in Venice. Doxaras painted notable portraits of Johann Matthias von der Schulenburg. He introduced Maniera Italiana to the Heptanese school, drastically changing the style from the Maniera Greca. He is considered the father of the Greek Rococo and the Modern Greek Enlightenment in art.

== History ==
Panayiotis was born in a small village named Koutifari, close to Kalamata in the Peloponnese region. His father's name was Nicholas. The Panayiotis family moved to Zakynthos when he was at a young age. His parents signed an agreement with the famous painter Leos Moskos to teach him painting. He traveled with the artist to Venice. Panayiotis married into the Bon family who were Catholic. They had six daughters and two sons. His two sons Nicholas and Demetrios became famous painters.

By age 30, he was a soldier. He fought for the Venetian Empire in the Peloponnese region for five years against the Ottoman Empire. In 1699, he traveled to Venice and studied Italian painting for five years. He started to become a theoretical painter, becoming interested in the science of painting. He settled in Kalamata with his family until 1715. When the area was invaded he fled with his family to Lefkada and in 1720 he traveled back to Venice.

While Panayiotis was in Venice he translated books into Greek from Italian. He translated Trattato de la pittura de Leonardo da Vinci. Panayiotis admired Leonardo da Vinci and some of his works resemble Leonardo's Virgin of the Rocks. He also translated the works of Leon-Battista Alberti, Andrea Pozzo, and a large catalog containing the most famous painters in the world. His book Common Teaching (Keni Didaskalia) was inspired by Marco Boschini's, Le Ricche Minere della Pittura Veneziana.

In 1721, the Venetian government gave Panayiotis land in Lefkada, but in 1722 he preferred to move to Corfu. While he was in Corfu. Panayiotis published his book Common Teaching (Keni Didaskalia) in 1726. One year later he painted Agios Spiridonas church. He also painted the ceiling of Panagia Faneromeni in Zakynthos. The work was a masterpiece resembling Michelangelo's Sistine Chapel ceiling. He died in 1729. Panayiotis is considered one of the masters of theoretical painting of the 18th century. He inspired many Greek and Italian painters.

== Work ==
Panayioti's work signals a departure from Greek painting, namely the Cretan school and maniera greca towards Western European Renaissance art. Many Greek artists already started this transition: Ioannis Permeniates, Thomas Bathas, Michael Damaskinos, Theodore Poulakis and Elias Moskos to name a few. Panayiotis admired the Italian masters particularly Leonardo da Vinci, whose book Art of painting (Trattato della pittura) he translated into Greek.

In 1726, he wrote the famous, albeit controversial and debated theoretical text On painting (Περί ζωγραφίας). He addressed the need for Greek art to depart from Byzantine maniera greca towards Western European art. The article was originally published after Doxaras's death in 1871. His article is debated among scholars in Greece.

He was one of the first Greek painters that tried to realistically depict human faces in religious themes. Doxaras also introduced oil painting into Greek iconography. He attempted to replace the old method of mixing pigments with egg yolk. He painted the roof of Saint Spyridon Church in Corfu. He was inspired by the works of Paolo Veronese. The images faded and in the middle of the 19th century were replaced with newer ones painted by Nikolaos Aspiotis. Doxaras also painted some portraits, his most famous being that of Count Graf von der Schulenburg, leader of the Venetian army and defendant of Corfu, which he signed Panagiotis Doxaras, Lacedaemonian Horseman, 1725, May 15th (Hellenomnemon, p. 19).

== Gallery ==
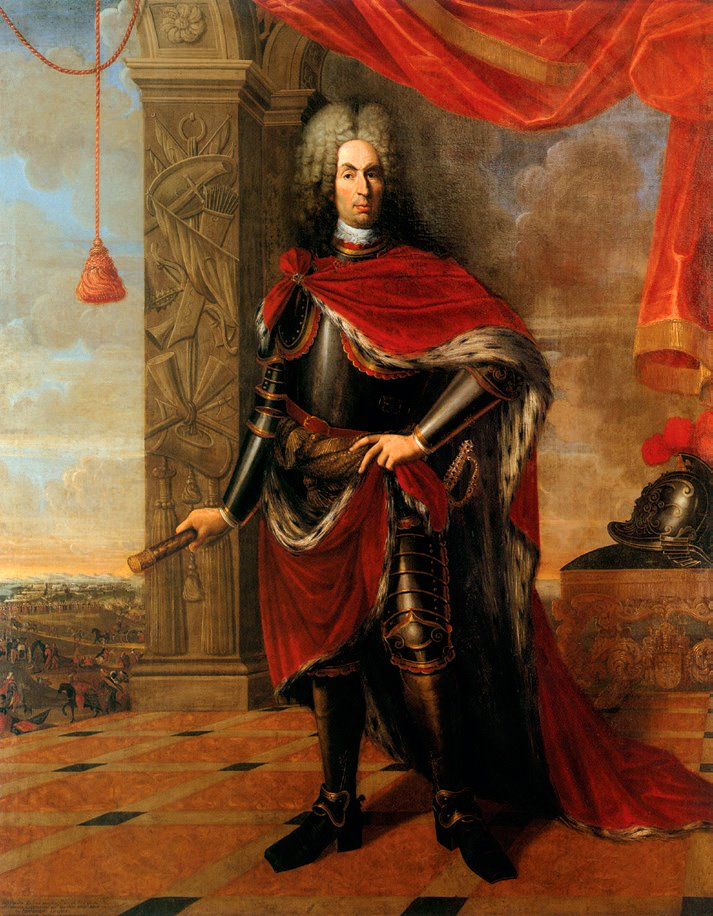
Count Johann Matthias von der Schulenburg

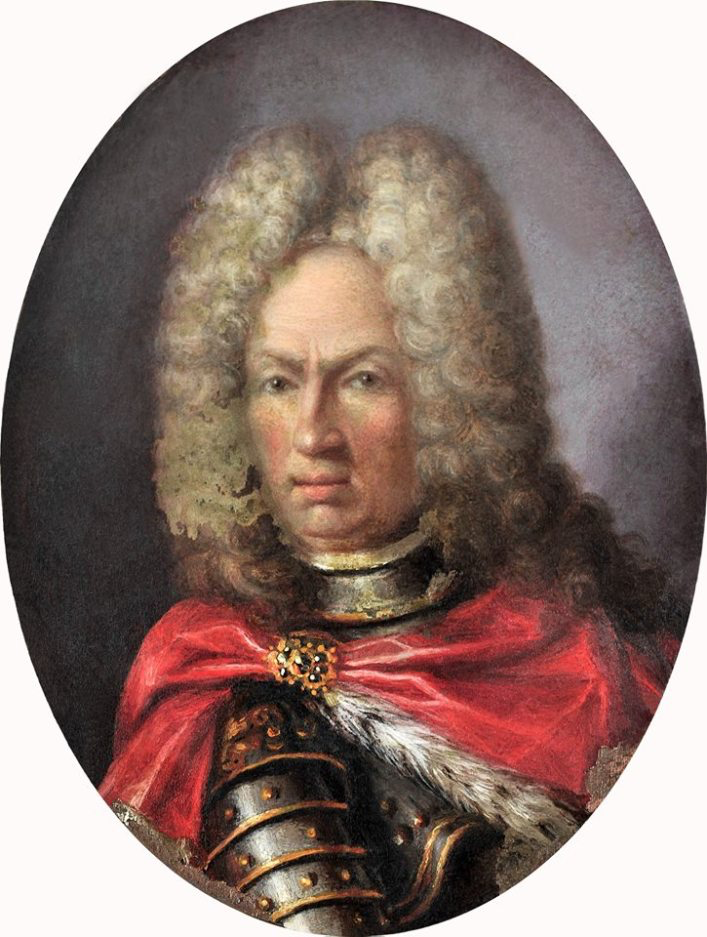
Matthias von der Schulenburg

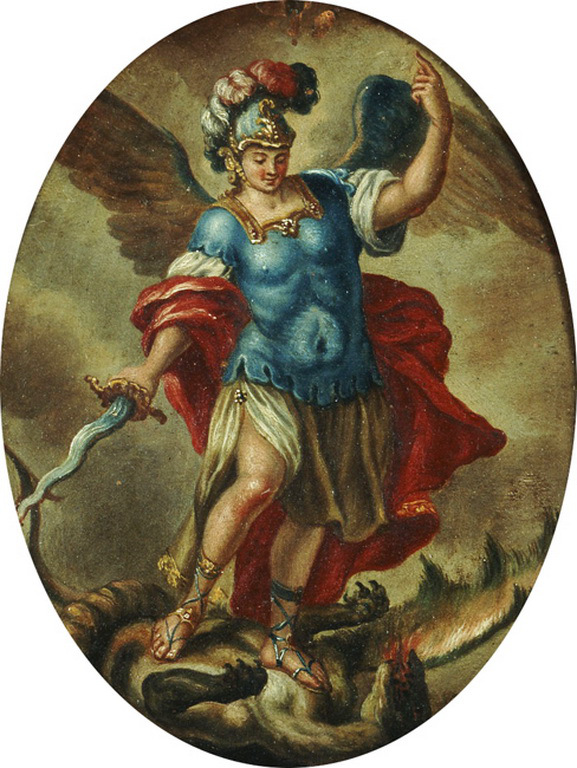
Archangel Michael

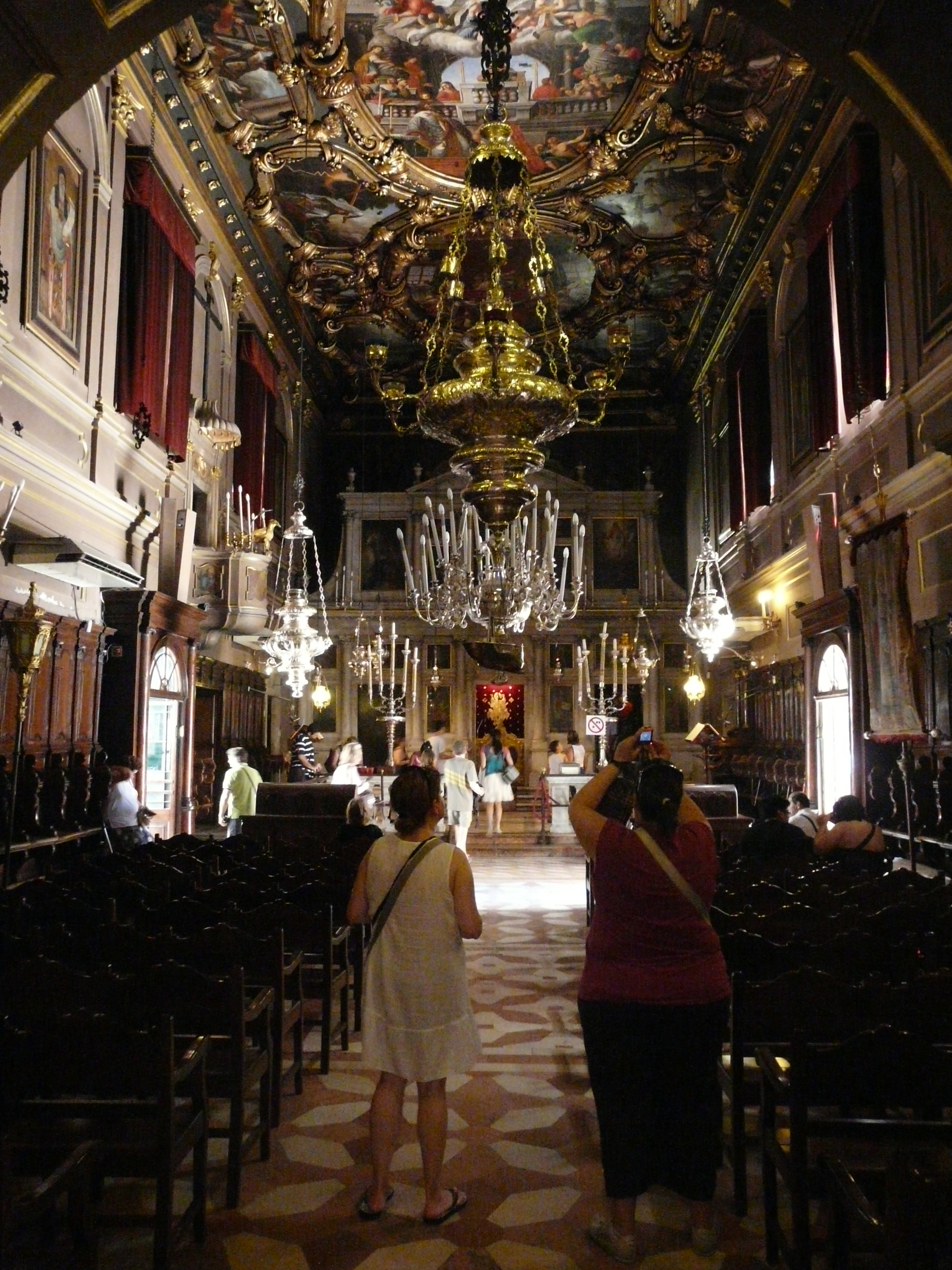
Saint Spyridon Church

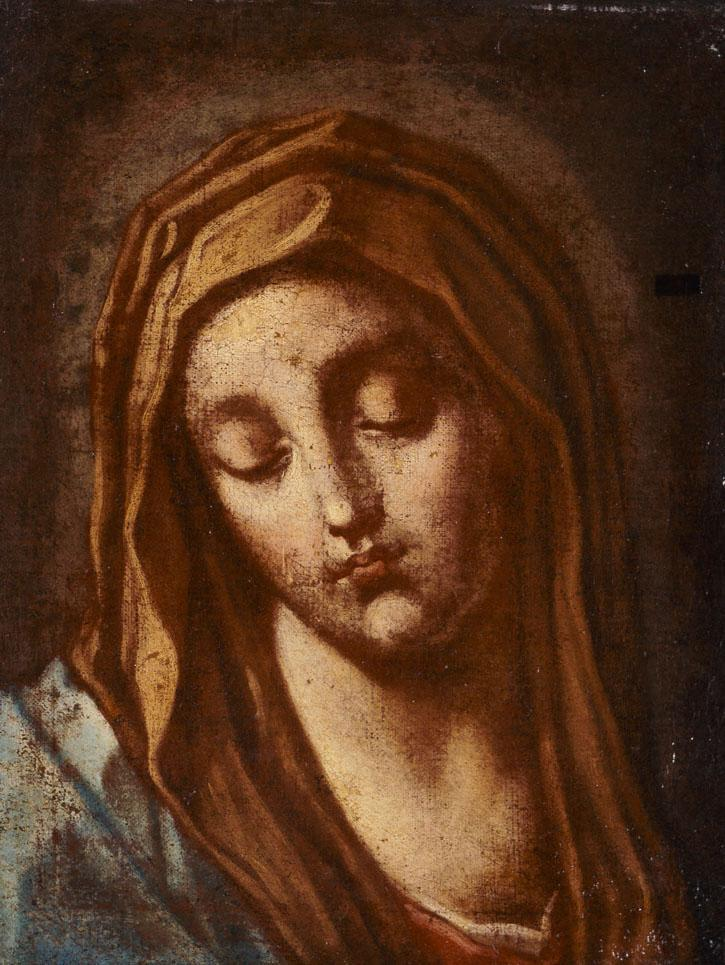
Virgin Mary

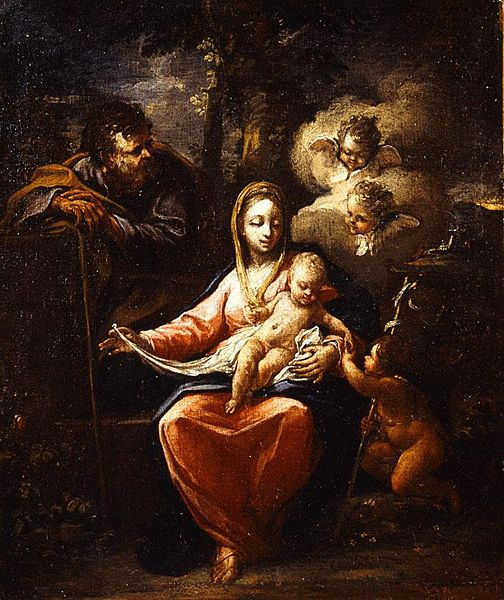
Holy Family

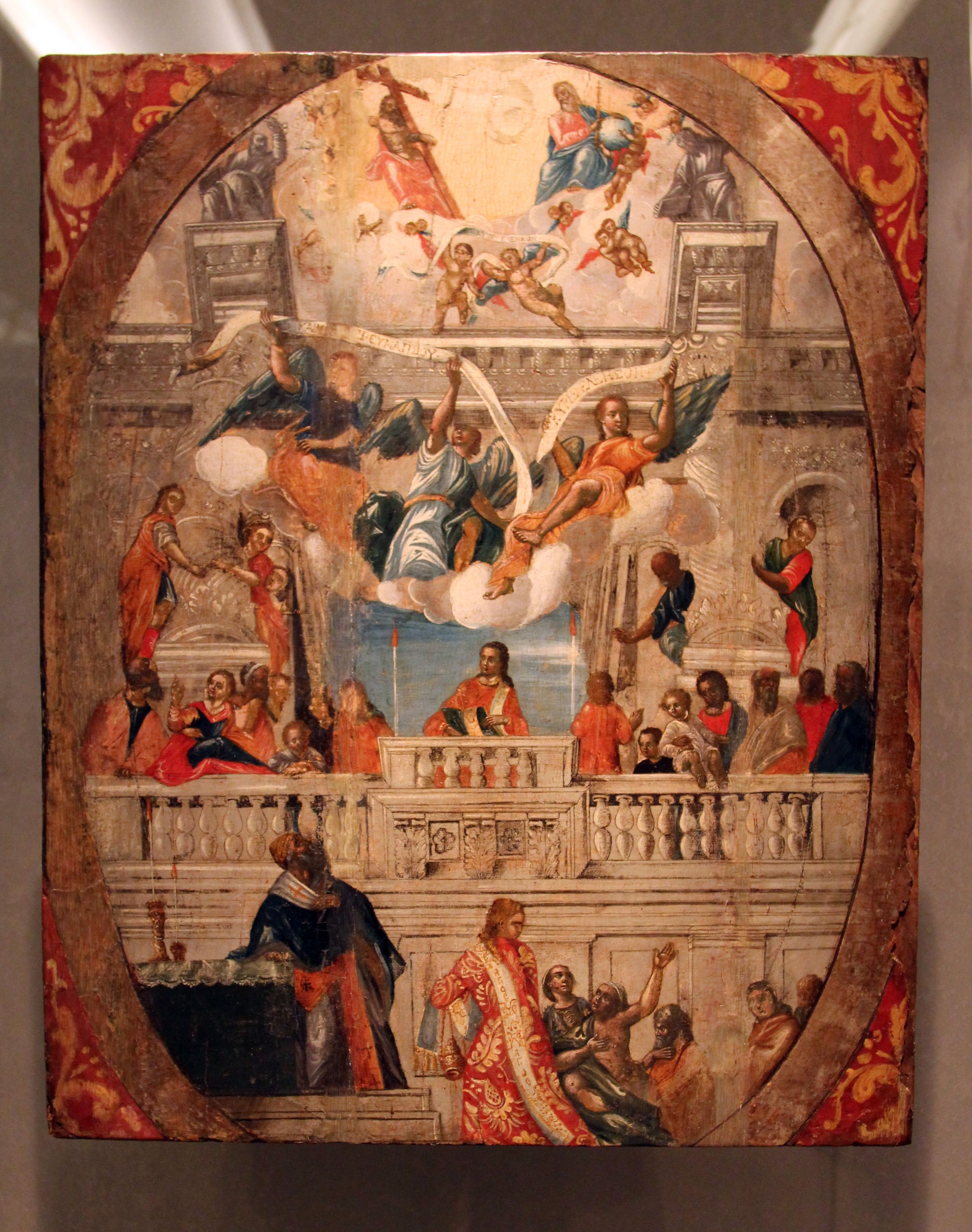
The liturgy of St Spyridon, Byzantine museum, Athens

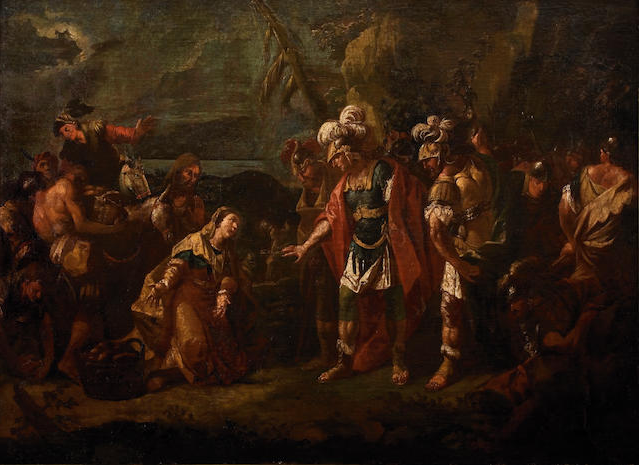
Alexander the Great

== Literary works ==
- Trattato dela Pittura de Leonardo da Vinci Greek Translation
- On painting (Περί ζωγραφίας) 1726

== Notable works ==
- Christ Megas Lady of the Angels, Zakynthos
- Saint Demetrios The Museum of Christian Art Lefkada
- The Holy Family (Doxaras) National Gallery of Athens

== See also ==
- Byzantine art
- Nikolaos Kallergis
