= Nikolaos Koutouzis =

Greek painter, poet and priest

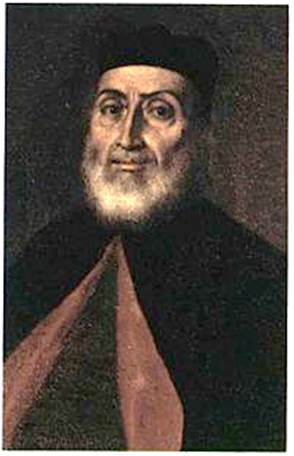
- Self-portrait
- Born: 1741; Zakynthos
- Died: July 23, 1813 (aged 71–72); Zakynthos
- Education: Apprentice to Nikolaos Doxaras; Apprentice to Giovanni Tiepolo
- Movement: Heptanese School; Neoclassicism; Greek Rococo

Nikolaos Koutouzis, or Koutousis (Greek: Νικόλαος Κουτούζης; 1741 – 1813) was a Greek painter, poet and priest. He was part of the Heptanese School, but also a member of the Modern Greek Enlightenment in art. His teacher was the painter Nikolaos Doxaras. Koutouzis has 136 paintings attributed to him, including fifteen portraits. He was one of the last Greek painters to incorporate the Venetian style during its decline, due to the Fall of the Republic of Venice. He was the teacher of Nikolaos Kantounis, who was heavily influenced by his style.

== Biography ==
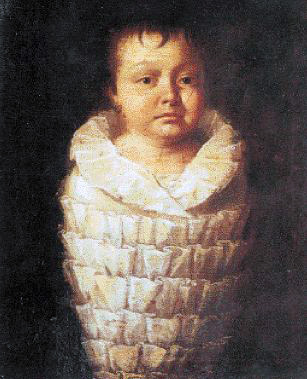
Said to be a portrait of Dionysios Solomos as a baby (c.1799/1800)

He was born in a part of Greece that was under Venetian, rather than Ottoman control. He appears to have taken his first art lessons from Nikolaos Doxaras, who lived on Zakynthos during the 1750s. At the age of sixteen, under his direction, Koutouzis painted decorations at the Churches of Saint John of Damascus and Saint Demetrius, both of which have since been destroyed. He may have lived in Venice from 1760 to 1764, and been apprenticed to Giovanni Tiepolo. If so, he was definitely back at Zakynthos in 1766, painting the "Procession of Saint Dionysius".

He also wrote satirical poems on local affairs and scandals, which often contained sharp lampoons of his contemporaries. In 1770, this led to an assault, during which he was wounded in the face. To hide the scar, he grew a beard. This event is also cited as his reason for becoming a priest, but it was seven years later before he took up priestly duties on Lefkada. He subsequently became a parish priest at several locations on his native island.

Nevertheless, he continued to write satirical poetry. This, combined with what was considered a theatrical manner of conducting church services, led to clashes with his superiors and parishioners. Eventually, he was charged with "misconduct and violation of the Orthodox ritual" and was defrocked in 1810. Three years later, some of his accusers recanted and he was reinstated but refused to take up his duties. He died a few months later. Although he focused on religious painting, his portraits were better known during his lifetime. He also took in the occasional student, most notably Nikolaos Kantounis.

== Gallery ==
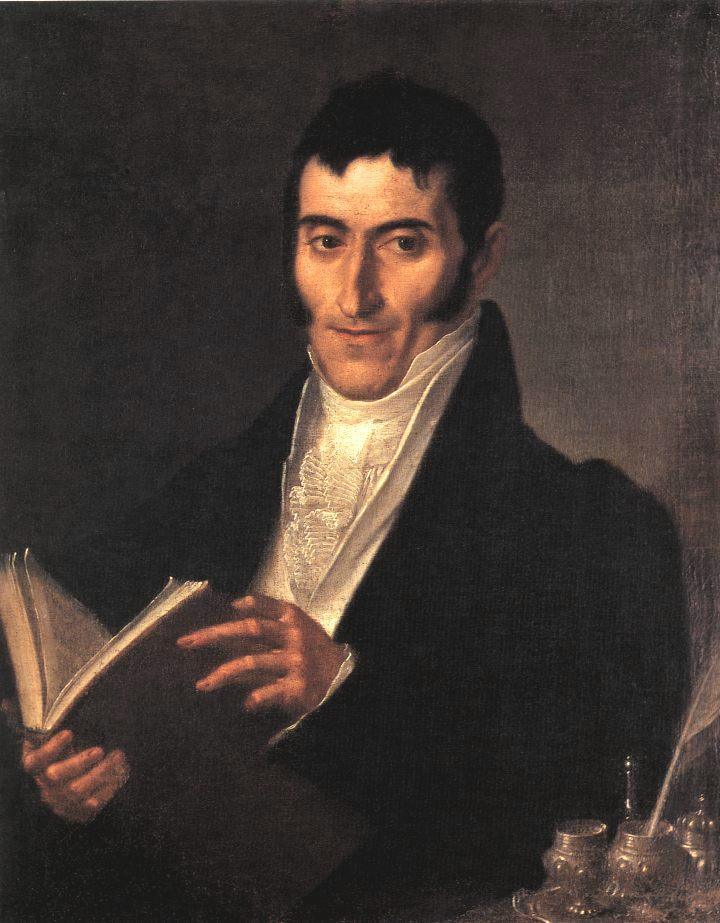
Portrait of a Scholar

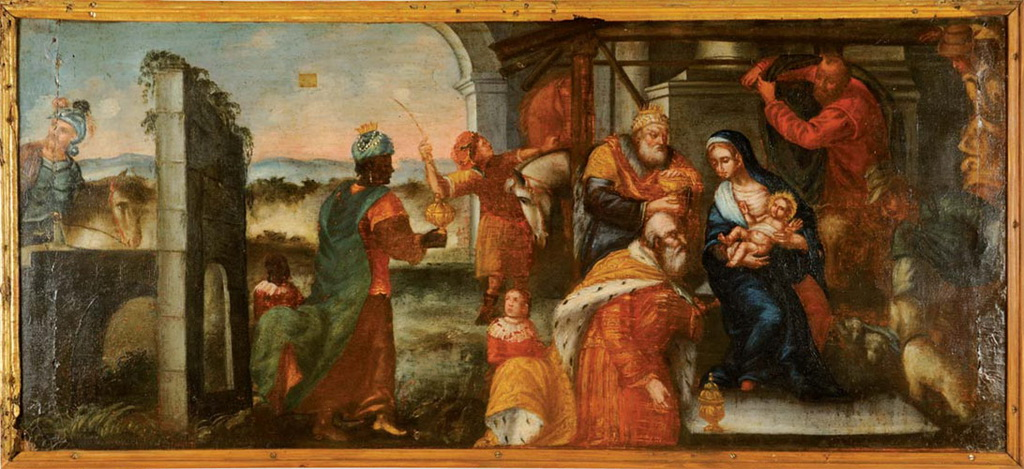
Adoration of the Magi

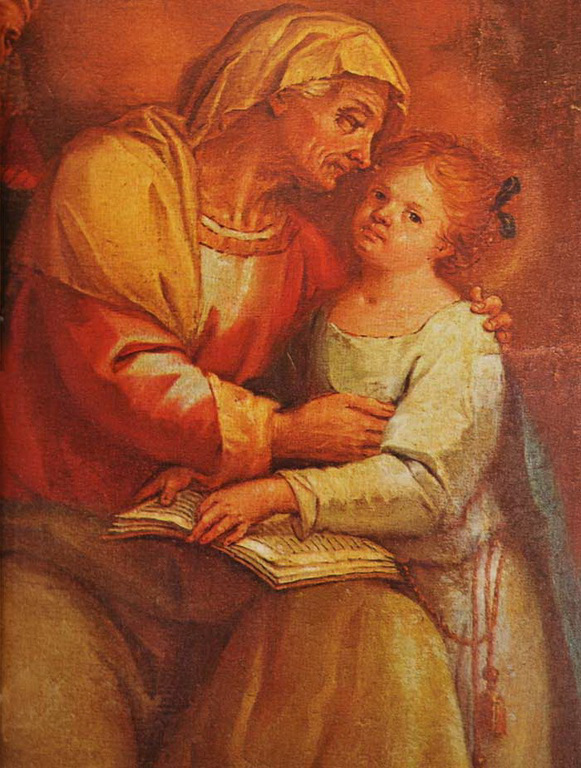
Saint Anna

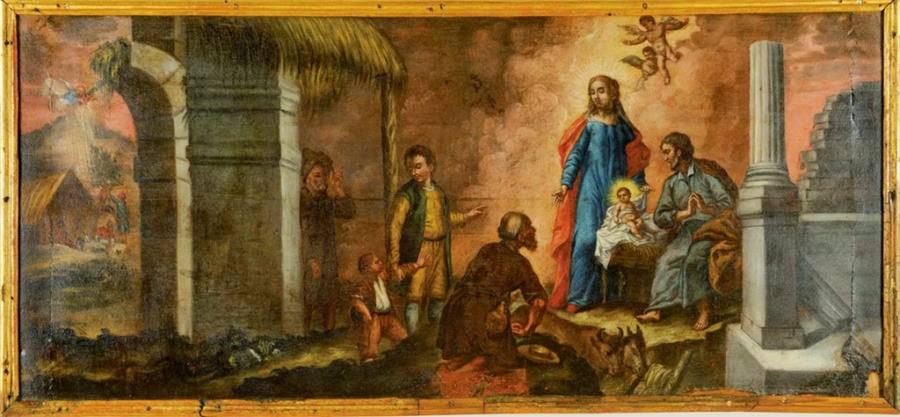
Adoration of the Shepherds

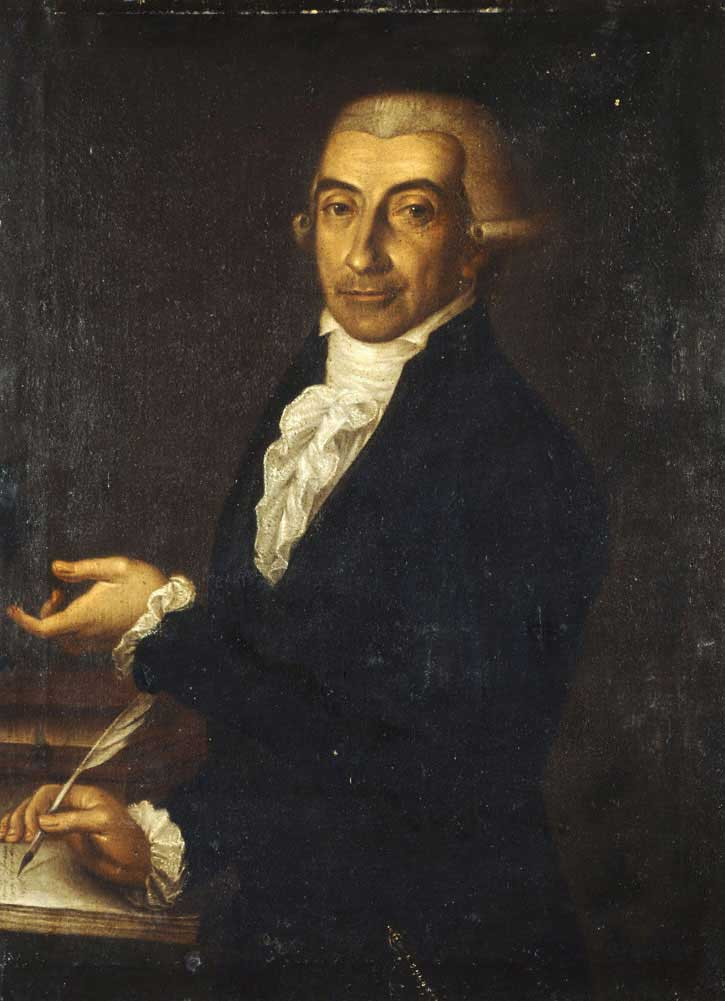
Portrait of a Nobleman
with a Wig

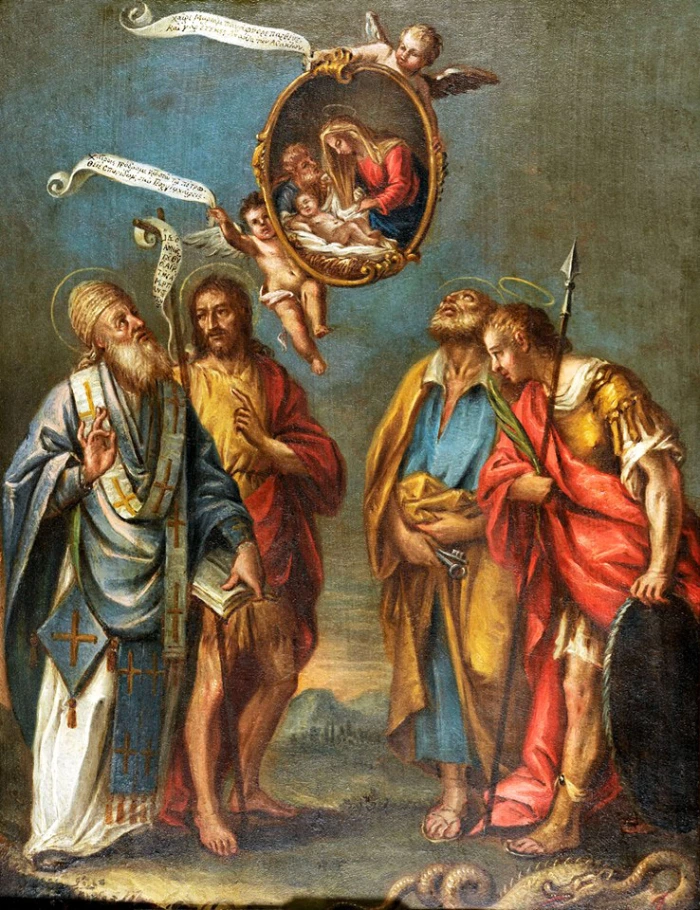
Saint Spyridon, Saint John the Baptist, Saint Peter and Saint George

== See also ==
- Self-portrait with Psalter
