= Johann Matthias von der Schulenburg =

German aristocrat, general, and art collector (1661–1747)

Reichsgraf Johann Matthias von der Schulenburg
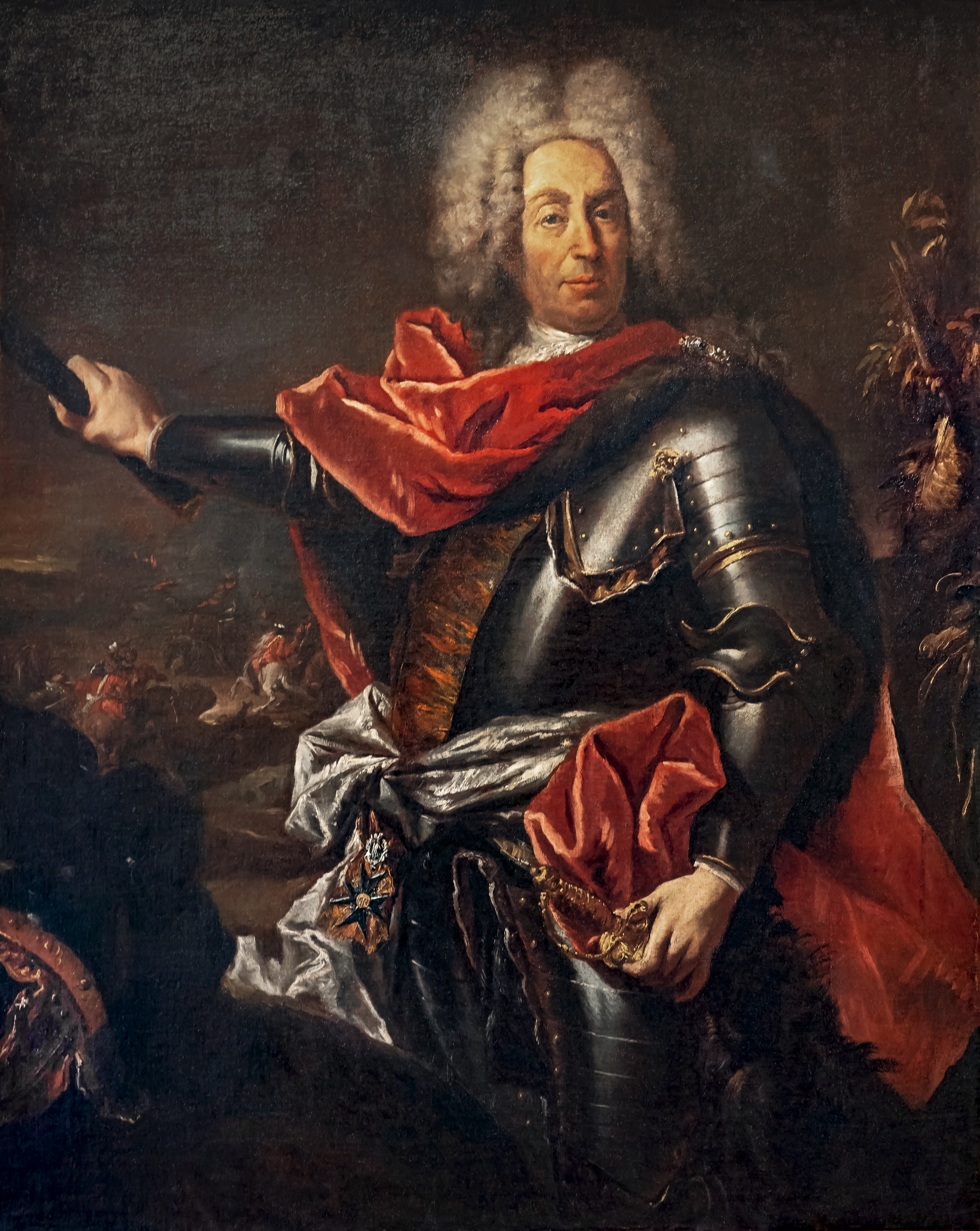
- Count Johann Matthias von der Schulenburg with the marshal's baton, 1741
- Born: 8 August 1661; Emden, Margraviate of Brandenburg, Brandenburg-Prussia, Holy Roman Empire
- Died: 14 March 1747 (aged 85); Verona, Republic of Venice
- Military career
- Allegiance: Brandenburg-Prussia; Electorate of Saxony; Republic of Venice
- Branch: Royal Saxon Army; Venetian Army
- Service years: 1687–1716
- Rank: Lieutenant General (Saxony); Field Marshal (Venice)
- Conflicts: Great Turkish War; Great Northern War; Battle of Kliszów; Battle of Poniec; Battle of Fraustadt; War of the Spanish Succession; Battle of Oudenarde; Battle of Malplaquet; Seventh Ottoman–Venetian War; Siege of Corfu
- Other work: Art collector

Marshal Johann Matthias Reichsgraf von der Schulenburg (8 August 1661 – 14 March 1747) was a German aristocrat and general of Brandenburg-Prussian background who served in the Saxon and Venetian armies in the early 18th century and found a second career in retirement in Venice, as a grand collector and patron.

Schulenburg was born in Emden near Magdeburg. His father was Gustavus Adolphus, Baron von der Schulenburg. His sister was Melusine von der Schulenburg, Duchess of Kendal.

== Military career ==
Between 1687 and 1688, Schulenburg fought with the Imperial troops against the Turks in Hungary. On his return he rose in the ranks of the army of the Duchy of Brunswick-Lüneburg. In 1699 he became a Colonel in the German regiment in the service of Victor Amadeus II of Savoy, and was severely wounded in 1701. In 1702 he joined the Saxon Army and fought in the Great Northern War against Charles XII of Sweden and suffered defeats in the Battle of Klissow, Battle of Fraustadt and the resulting Swedish invasion of Saxony in 1706. He returned to Western Europe in 1707 and fought under Prince Eugene of Savoy at the Battle of Oudenaarde, the Siege of Tournai and the Battle of Malplaquet in the wars of Spanish Succession.

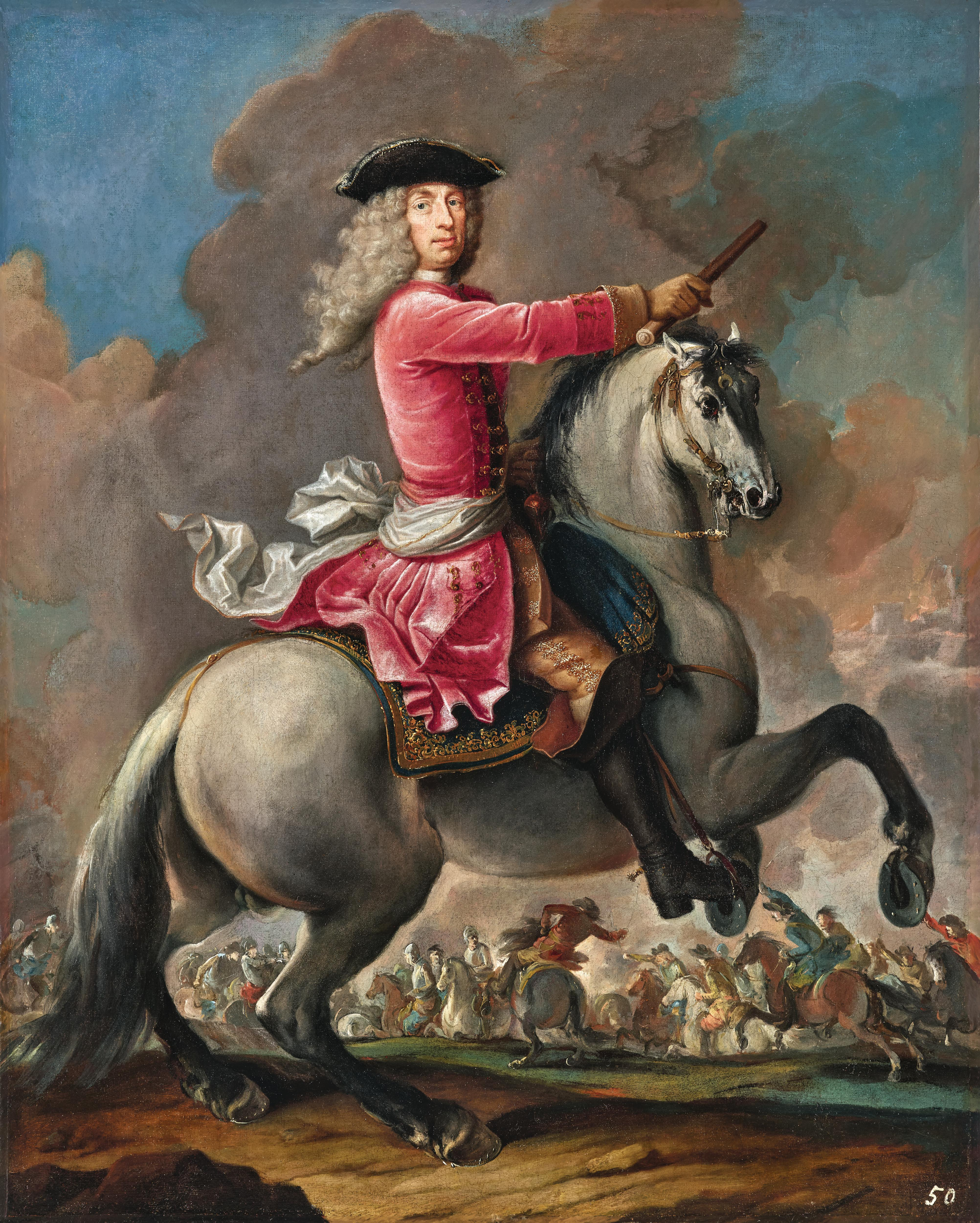
Equestrian portrait of von der Schulenburg c. 1736 by Giacomo Ceruti

The latter service brought him to the attention of Venice. He was recruited by Venice into the successful defence of Ulcinj in 1711 and five years later Corfu during the 1716 siege against the same invading Ottoman Turks; he was decorated by the Serenissima for his outstanding success with a statue and a pension of 5000 ducats a year. A Vivaldi oratorio, Juditha triumphans, was commissioned in celebration of the victory.

== Art collector ==
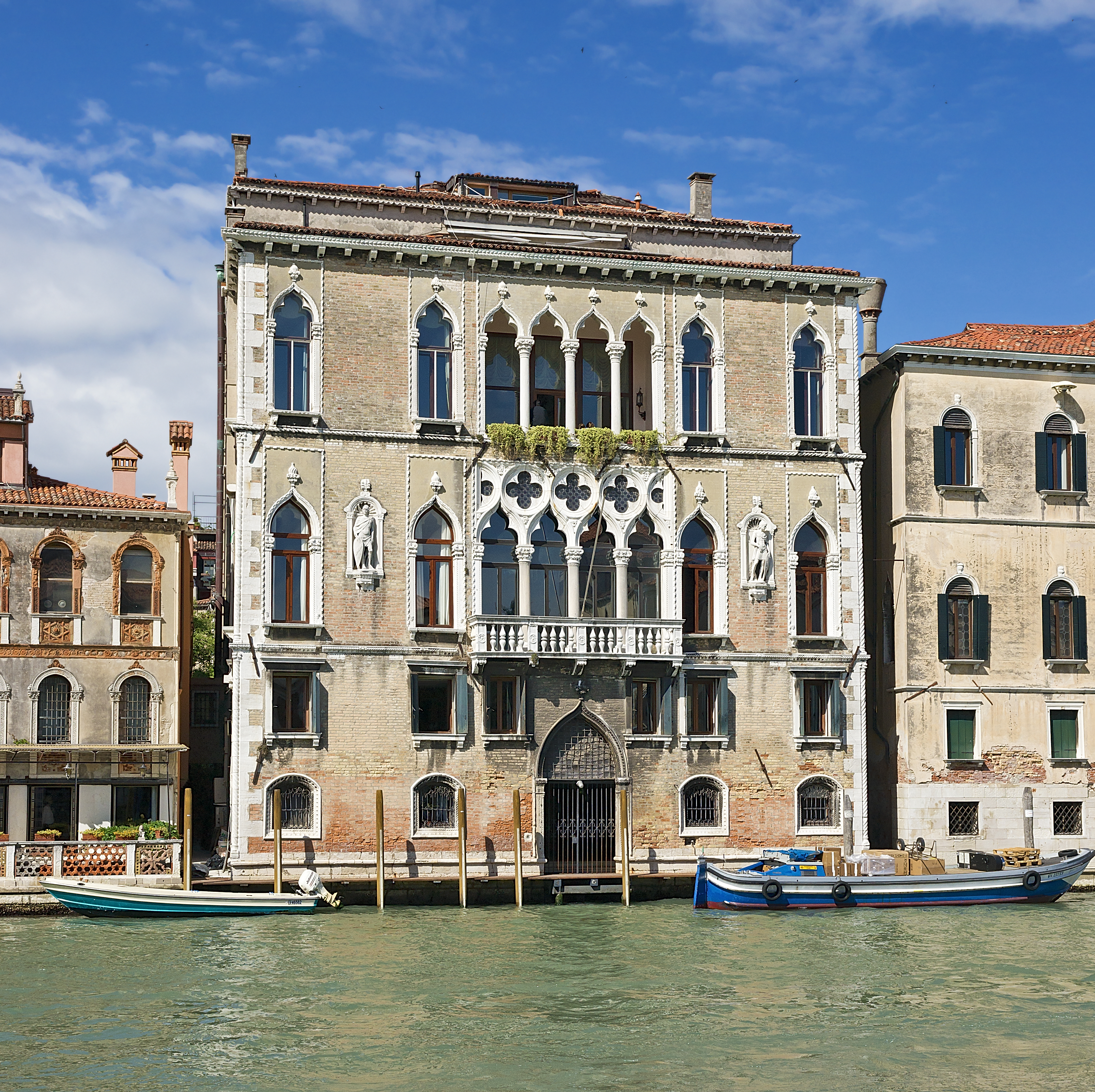
Palazzo Loredan

In his retirement in Venice from 1718, the Reichsgraf von der Schulenburg proved a remarkable collector of art while residing in the Palazzo Loredan on the Grand Canal of Venice. The Reichsgraf began as a serious collector in 1724, at the age of sixty-three, with a purchase of eighty-eight paintings and a bas-relief by Pierre Puget from a Venetian picture-dealer, Santi Rota, who had obtained them from the collection of Ferdinando Carlo Gonzaga, the last ruler of the Duchy of Mantua, deposed by Habsburg Austrian empire; Gonzaga's works of art included works by Raphael, Correggio, Giorgione, Giulio Romano, and Castiglione. In addition, Schulenburg had access to many royal families, including the Hanoverians, Bourbons, and Habsburgs; and served them as an intermediary and bon vivant host in the Venetian republic. His portrait was painted by Bartolomeo Nazari, Giuseppe Nogari, Giacomo Ceruti, Gian Antonio Guardi (in Ca' Rezzonico), Francesco Simonini, and Piazzetta, and he was sculpted by Antonio Corradini and Gian Maria Morlaiter. He also had a relationship with famous Greek painter Panagiotis Doxaras and his son Nikolaos Doxaras. Nikolaos Doxaras lived with Schulenburg in Venice from 1730-1738 at the Palazzo Loredan. He was his confidant at the Schulenburg Art Gallery. He also painted for Schulenburg.

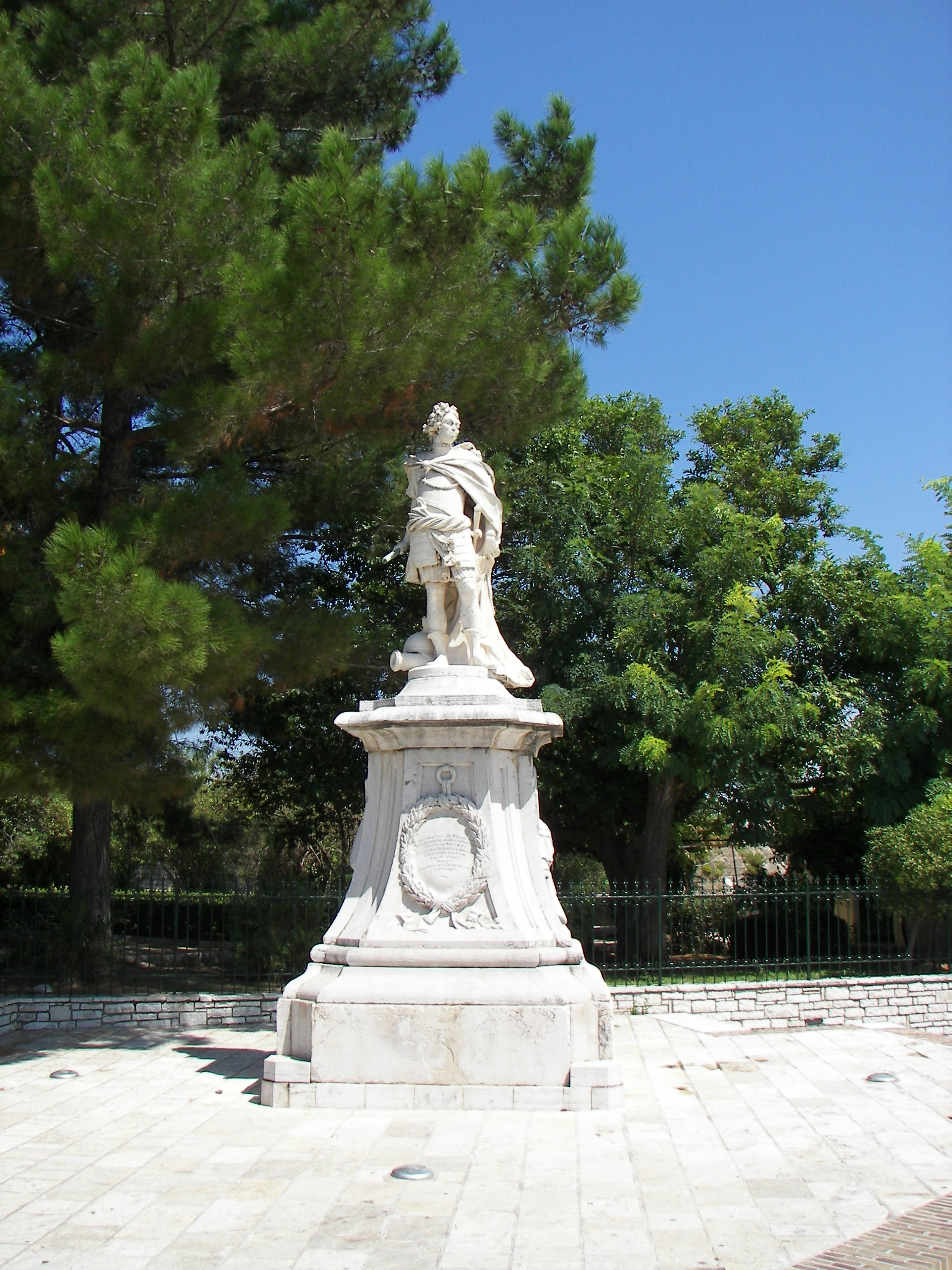
Johann Matthias Reichsgraf von der Schulenburg: marble statue in Corfu.

Schulenburg supported Gian Antonio Guardi with a monthly salary, 1730–36, and on a commission basis thereafter. In general, Guardi worked at making portraits of foreign aristocracy and royalty to impressively adorn the walls at Ca' Loredan, and at copying masterpieces of the Venetian past including works of Paolo Veronese and Tintoretto. Francesco Simonini was commissioned to produce a series of paintings commemorating Schulenburg's battles. Canaletto painted a view of Corfu, the site of his victories.

He also employed Giambattista Pittoni, 1733–38, for history paintings, and as advisor and restorer. Finally, Giovanni Battista Piazzetta had a close relationship with the Marshal, both as painter as an agent for buying both Flemish and genre paintings, two types of works popular with Schulenburg; Piazzetta made an inventory of the collection in 1739.

Schulenburg's paintings were mainly Italian works of the sixteenth and seventeenth centuries, with some Flemish and Dutch paintings. He owned six paintings by Giacomo Ceruti. He owned vedute by Michele Marieschi, Luca Carlevaris, Giovanni Battista Cimaroli, Antonio Joli, Marco Ricci, and Francesco Zuccarelli; thus he overlapped to some degree with the collecting of the contemporary British ambassador, Joseph Smith. Many of his works were transferred to his estates in Germany, like Emden, Hehlen and Beetzendorf. Schulenburg did not have children and, though he willed his collection en bloc to his nephew Count Adolf Friedrich von der Schulenburg-Beetzendorf with the stipulation that they be kept together, in the Palais Schulenburg in Berlin, his will was not honoured. After his death, his collection was dispersed. A distinguished customer was Frederick II of Prussia. A group of 150 pieces were sold at auction in London in April 1775.

== Sources ==
- Fr. Albr. v. d. Schulenburg: Leben und Denkwürdigkeiten des Johann Matthias v. d. Schulenburg (Leipzig 1834, 2 vols.). (Life and facts about Johann Matthias Schulenburg (Leipzig 1834, 2 Vol.))
- Werner v. d. Schulenburg: Der König von Korfu 1950. A novelistic account of the siege of Corfu.Roman über die Verteidigung Korfus gegen die Türken); 1950. (The King of Corfu. An account of the defense of Corfu against the Turks. (1950)).
- Haskell, Francis (1993). "Chapter 11". Patrons and Painters: Art and Society in Baroque Italy. 1980. Yale University Press. pp. 311–13.
