= Nikolaos Doxaras =

18th-century Greek painter

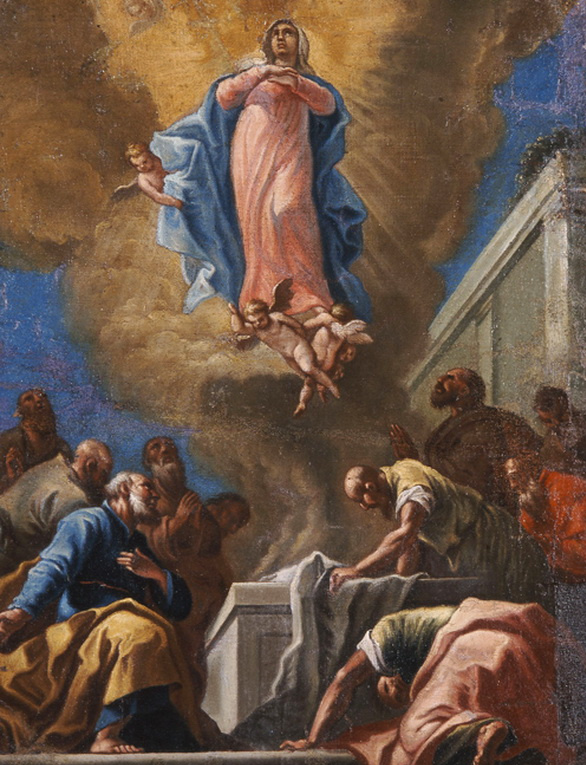
- Assumption of Mary
- Born: 1706; Kalamata
- Died: 1775 (aged 68–69); Zakynthos
- Notable work: Fresco's Panagia Faneromeni
- Movement: Greek Rocco; Heptanese School; Neoclassicism
- Spouse: Chrisi Pantazi Psoma
- Patrons: Johann Schulenburg

Nikolaos Doxaras (Greek: Νικόλαος Δοξαράς; 1706/10 – 2 March 1775). He was a Greek painter and teacher. His father was famous painter Panagiotis Doxaras. Panagiotis Doxaras was the father of the Greek Rococo and the Modern Greek Enlightenment in art. They are both prominent members of the Heptanese School. They refined Greek art bringing the Maniera Greca into the Maniera Italiana. Artists he influenced include: Nikolaos Kantounis, Nikolaos Koutouzis and Gerasimos Pitsamanos. His influence can be seen in some of Nikolaos Kantounis's paintings notably The Assumption. Nikolaos taught famous painter Nikolaos Koutouzis. Both Nikolaos Koutouzis and Doxaras artistic style refined the art of the Ionian Islands. Venetian painting influenced countless Greek artists who were living in the empire. From Michael Damaskinos to Theodore Poulakis. Twenty years after Nikolaos's death the style came to an end due to the Fall of the Republic of Venice. A new artistic style developed after the Greek Rococo which coincided with Neoclassicism in the rest of Europe called the middle Modern Greek Enlightenment in art also known as Neo-Hellenikos Diafotismos.

== History ==
He was born in Kalamata. His father was famous painter Panagiotis Doxaras his mother's last name was Bon. They were a prominent family. He had seven brothers and sisters. His brother Demetrios was also a famous painter. His father was a theoretical painter who translated several books from Italian. His father studied the science of painting and wrote On painting (Περί ζωγραφίας) in 1726. In 1715, his family moved to Lefkada.

His father Panagiotis Doxaras traveled to Venice in 1720. The family was given land in Lefkada by the government but they moved to Corfu. He was with his father in 1723 in Corfu. He was a soldier in the Venetian Army. He was under the command of Johann Schulenberg. He was a flag bearer. While he was in Corfu with his father, he assisted his father in painting Saint Spyridon Church. He was Panagiotis Doxaras helper. Panagiotis Doxaras died in 1729.

Panagiotis Doxaras left his son Nicholas his military office and persona. His brother Demetrios inherited Panagioti's artistic painting tools. Nicholas received a diamond ring and a holy cross. In 1729 Nikolas went to Lefkada. Around the month of August, he gave his brother Demetrios the land they inherited to cultivate. He left for Venice for ten years.

Nikolaos was listed in the financial registers of Palazzo Loredan as a guest of Johann Schulenberg. He was listed as an integral part of the Schulenburg Art Gallery. He was his close confidant. Johann Schulenberg accumulated a massive art collection. He also had some of the most famous artists in the world working for him. Information is archived regarding Doxaras's art from 1730-1738.

While Nicholas was at the Schulenburg Art Gallery he created a small painting on sheepskin, a painting of a musical instrument and paintings with mythological figures. He also copied portraits of Schulenburg and Cromwell. He also painted the inner circle of Schulenburg and their wives. He painted Bacchus, Ariadne, the Sacrifice of Iphigenia and the city of Corfu with a view of the sea.

He left Venice with the rank of Captain. He moved back to Lefkada. While in Lefkada he married Chrisi Pantazi Psoma. He served the Venetian Army in Corfu, Lefkada, Cephalonia and Zakynthos. He continued painting throughout his life. While he was in Zakynthos, he painted the ceiling and the walls of the Church of Faneromeni. He was also a teacher. He taught famous painter Nikolaos Koutouzis.

In 1761, while in Zakynthos, he agreed to paint the church of Agios Minas in Lefkada. He painted the ceiling. Nikolaos Doxaras was in possession of his father's special painting notebook. He used the book throughout his life as a guide to painting. He added a special portion about gilding images in Italian. He died in Zakynthos in 1775. Some of his works were damaged during the earthquake of 1953. Luckily they were restored by experts. His paintings can be found in the National Art Gallery of Greece. The Birth of the Mother of God, is at the Byzantine Museum of Zakynthos.

== Paintings ==
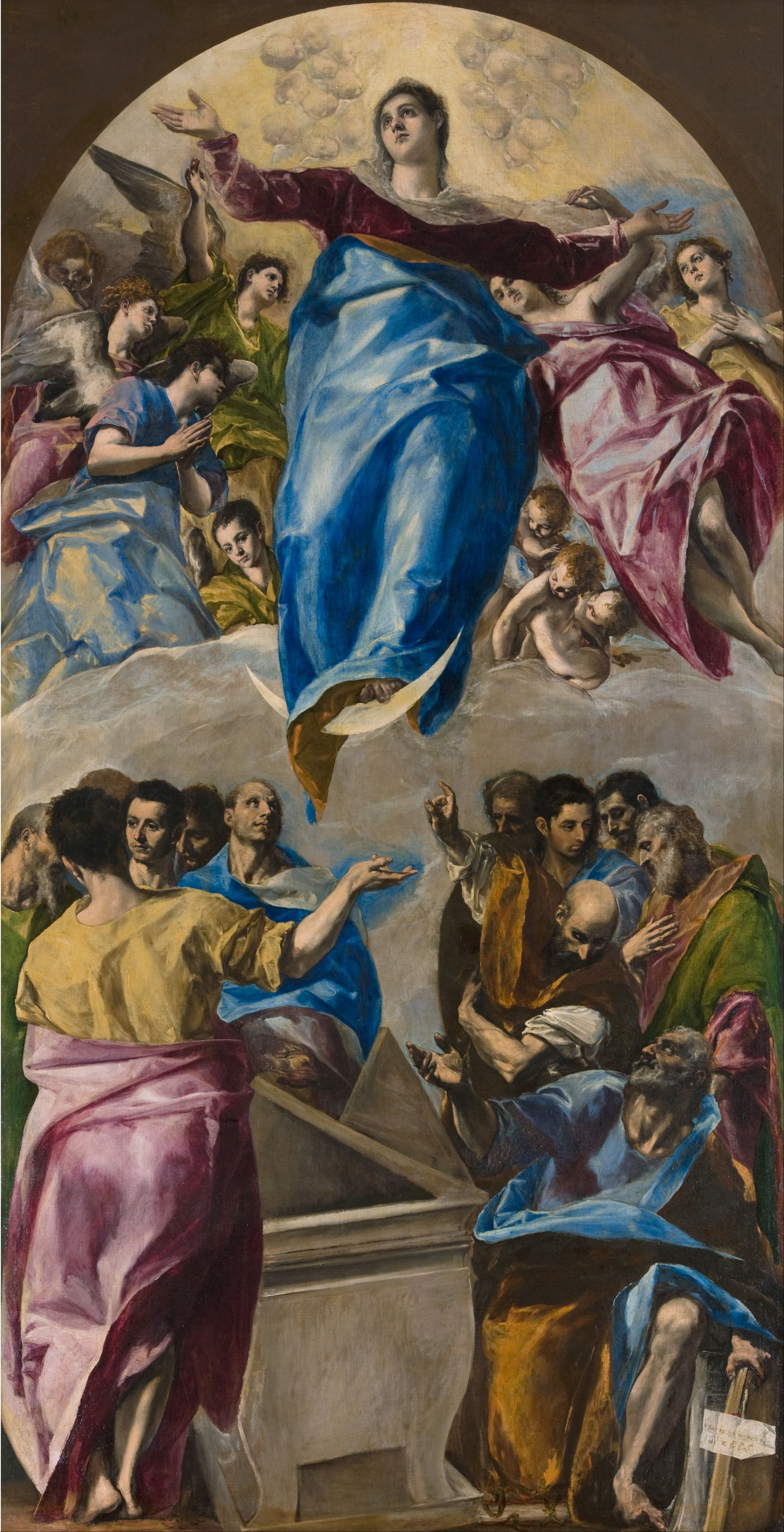
The Assumption of the Virgin, El Greco (1577–1579)

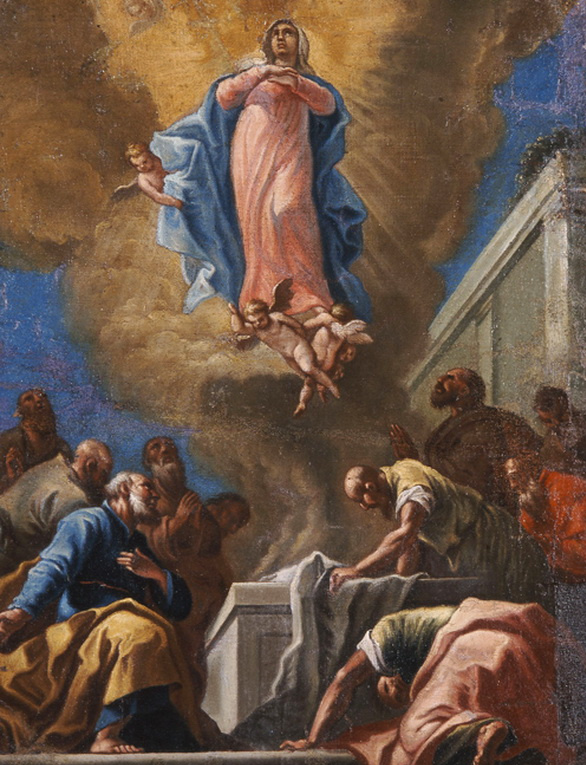
The Assumption of the Virgin Nikolaos Doxaras

El Greco and Doxaras painted the Assumption of the Virgin Mary. The paintings possess geometric similarities. El Greco's painting has more figures. The figures at the bottom of the painting seem to converse about the Virgin. She is a large figure in the heavens surrounded by Angels. El Greco's figures take up more of the canvas. In the heavens, he has more figures than Doxaras but at the bottom of the painting, both artists have a similar number of people. The Virgin's hands are open, exhibiting the Panagia, mother embracing the earth. In the Doxaras, the Virgin's hands are closed, and the mother is embracing heaven. In the El Greco she is on top of the moon. Clearly El Greco influenced Doxaras to some extent. El Greco's paintings were all over the world at the time. He was a very popular artist.

In the Doxaras painting, the Virgin occupies a similar space. She is in the heavens surrounded by three angles. The clouds of the heavens are clearer and more available to the eye of the viewer. The painting clearly exhibits the elevation. The angles seem to be holding her up. The figures at the bottom of the painting are kneeling in awe and respect to the appearance of the Virgin. The figures at the bottom of the Doxaras take up less of the canvas. Compared to the El Greco the figures are more attentive to the supernatural appearance of the Mother of God in the Doxaras. Both paintings have a similar number of figures at the bottom but Doxaras makes a clearer statement of purpose. The Doxaras exhibits a Neoclassical feel corresponding to the art of the time. The painting is a symbol of the Modern Greek Enlightenment in art. Doxaras and El Greco were painting masters. Nikolaos's father Panagiotis Doxaras was a theoretical painter. He appreciated the painting masters. The painting structure was emulated by Nikolaos Kantounis in the Ascension of the Christ.

== Gallery ==
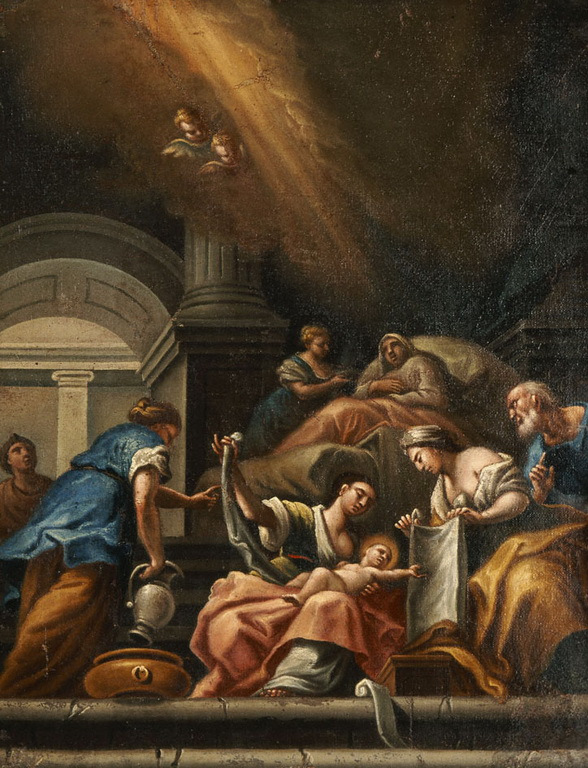
Birth of the Virgin

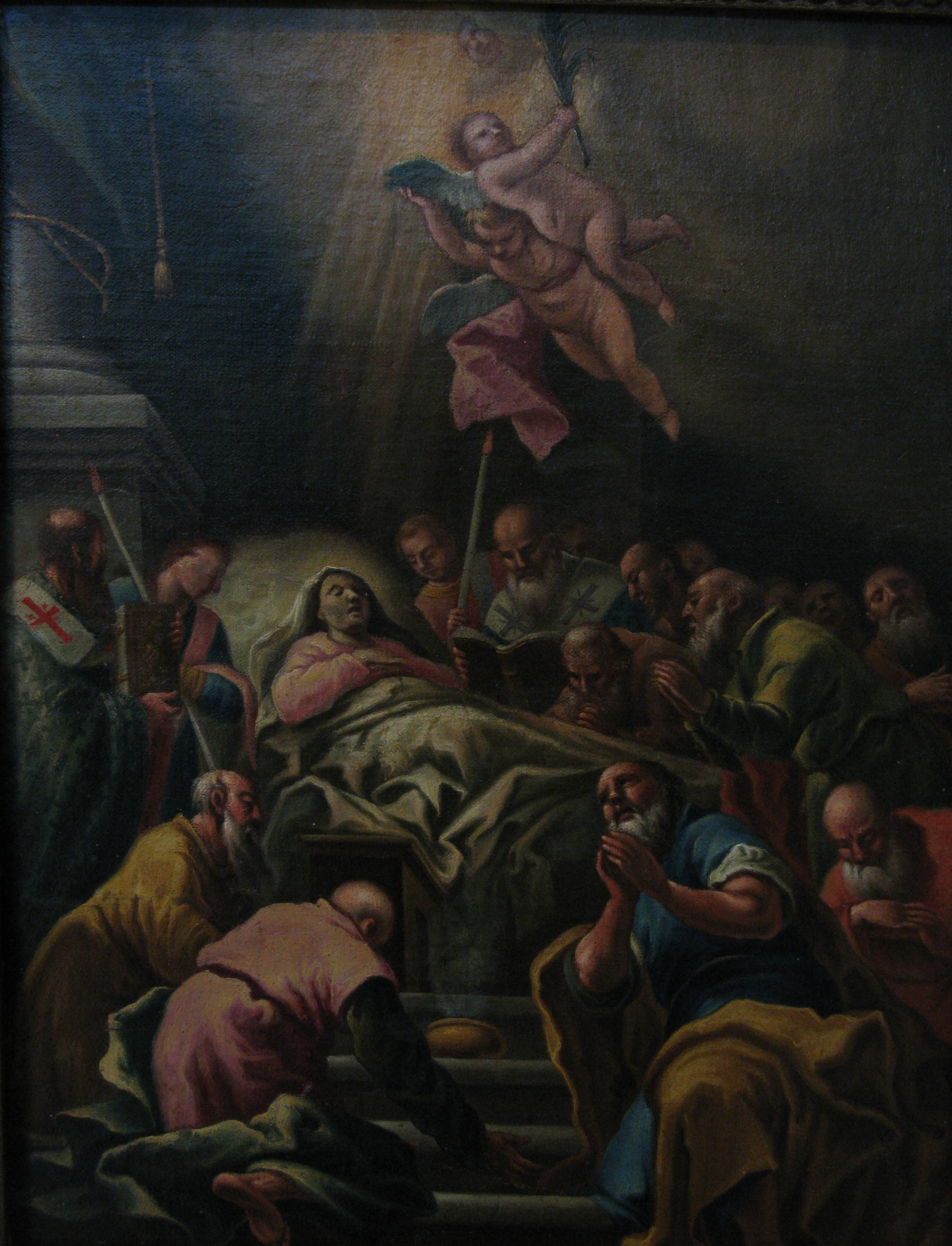
Dormition of the Virgin Mary

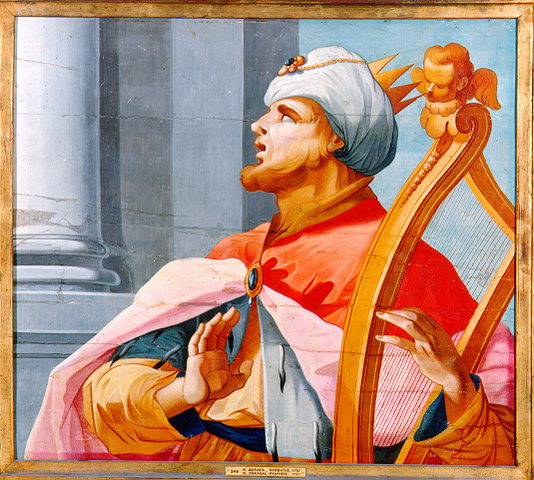
Prophet David

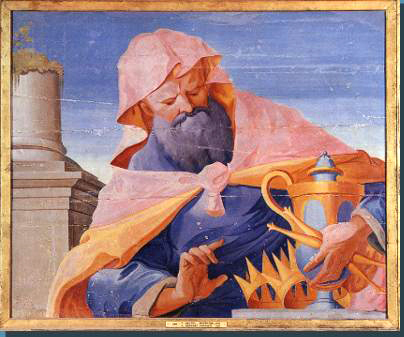
One of the Prophets

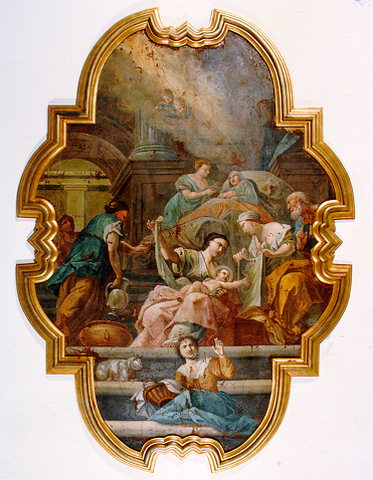
The Birth of the Virgin
