= Ventura =

Ventura may refer to:

== Places ==
=== Brazil ===
- Boa Ventura de São Roque, a municipality in the state of Paraná, southern Brazil
- Boa Ventura, Paraíba, a municipality in the state of Paraíba, in the northeast region of Brazil

=== United States ===
==== California ====
- Ventura, California, a medium size city in southern California
- Ventura Boulevard, in the San Fernando Valley of Los Angeles
- Ventura County, California, a county in southern California, next to Los Angeles County
- Ventura Farms, a ranch featured in a number of Western films, in the Hidden Valley in Thousand Oaks
- Ventura Oil Field, a large and currently productive oil field in the hills north of Ventura, in southern California

==== Other states ====
- Ventura, Iowa, a city in Cerro Gordo County, Iowa
- Ventura, Minnesota, former name of St. Augusta, Minnesota
- Ventura, New Mexico, a census-designated place in Luna County, New Mexico, US
- Ventura Village, Minneapolis, a neighborhood within the Phillips community in Minneapolis
- Buenaventura Lakes, Florida, a census-designated place (CDP) in northern Osceola County, Florida

=== Other countries ===
- PortAventura World, an entertainment resort in Salou and Vila-seca, Tarragona, on the Costa Daurada in Catalonia, Spain

== People ==
=== Surname ===
- Ventura (surname)

=== Given name ===
==== Arts and media ====
- Ventura Alonzo (1904–2000), Mexican-born American musician
- Ventura Gassol (1893-1980), Catalan poet, playwright and politician
- Ventura Mazza, or Mazzi or Marzi or Mazi or Magi (c.1560-1638), Italian painter of the late-Renaissance
- Ventura Pons Sala (born 1945), Spanish movie director
- Ventura Rodríguez (1717–1785), Spanish architect and artist
- Ventura Ruiz Aguilera (1820–1881), Spanish lyric poet, called "the Spanish Béranger"
- Ventura Tenario (1911–1984), with ring name of Chief Little Wolf, American professional wrestler

==== Politics ====
- Ventura Blanco y Calvo de Encalada (c.1782–1856), Chilean political figure
- Ventura García Calderón, or Francisco García Calderón (1834-1905), lawyer and Provisional President of the Republic of Peru
- Ventura Gassol (1893-1980), Catalan poet, playwright and politician
- Ventura Miguel Marcó del Pont (1768-1836), Spanish merchant and treasurer for the Viceroyalty of the Río de la Plata

==== Sport ====
- Ventura Alvarado Aispuro (born 1992), American soccer player
- Ventura Díaz (born 1937), former Spanish cyclist
- Ventura Tenario (1911–1984), with ring name of Chief Little Wolf, American professional wrestler

==== Other people with the given name ====
- Ventura Benassai (died 1511), Italian Roman Catholic Bishop of Massa Marittima
- Ventura Bufalini (died 1504), Roman Catholic Bishop of Terni (1499–1504) and Bishop of Città di Castello
- Ventura Monge Domínguez (1914–1937), an infantry officer of the General Staff of the Spanish

== Arts, entertainment, and media ==
=== Fictional entities ===
- Ace Ventura, a detective in Warner Bros comedy films
- Las Venturas, San Andreas, a city in Grand Theft Auto series of video games
- Luke Ventura, a character from the TV series Married... with Children
- Marisa Ava Marie Ventura, a character in the American romantic comedy-drama Maid in Manhattan
- Sharon Ventura, also known as She-Thing, a character in American comic books by Marvel Comics

=== Music ===
- Ventura (Phish album)
- Ventura (Anderson Paak album)
- Ventura (Los Hermanos album)
- "Ventura", a song by Thomas Bangalter from the Irréversible soundtrack, 2002

== Sport ==
- Ventura (horse), an American race horse
- Ventura Black Widows, a women's tackle football Tier 3 team, was founded in 2008 by Ahmad Newton of Los Angeles, CA
- Ventura Oilers, a California League baseball team based in Ventura

== Technology ==
- Corel Ventura, a software package from Corel Corporation
- macOS Ventura, the 2022 release of Apple's desktop operating system macOS
- Paxman Ventura, a diesel engine
- Ventura Publisher, a desktop publishing software for MS-DOS and Windows

== Transportation ==
- Ventura Freeway, a highway connecting downtown Los Angeles with Ventura County, CA
- Lockheed Ventura, World War II aircraft
- MV Ventura, a cruise ship
- Pontiac Ventura, automobile produced by General Motors
- Ventura Bus Lines, Australian bus and coach company
- Ventura Intercity Service Transit Authority, a public transit agency providing bus service in Ventura County, California

== Other uses ==
- Ventura (Japanese guitars), a brand of stringed instruments imported from Japan by C. Bruno and Company during the 1960s and 1970s
- Ventura Lambrate, an international design show, held annually in April in Milan, Italy

== See also ==
- Boa Ventura (disambiguation)
- Buena Ventura (disambiguation)
- Venture (disambiguation)
