= A Scene from the Life of John Chrysostom (Ventouras) =

Painting by Spyridon Ventouras

- Σκηνή από τη Ζωή του Ιωάννη Χρυσοστόμου (Greek), Una Scena Dalla vita di Giovanni Crisostomo (Italian)
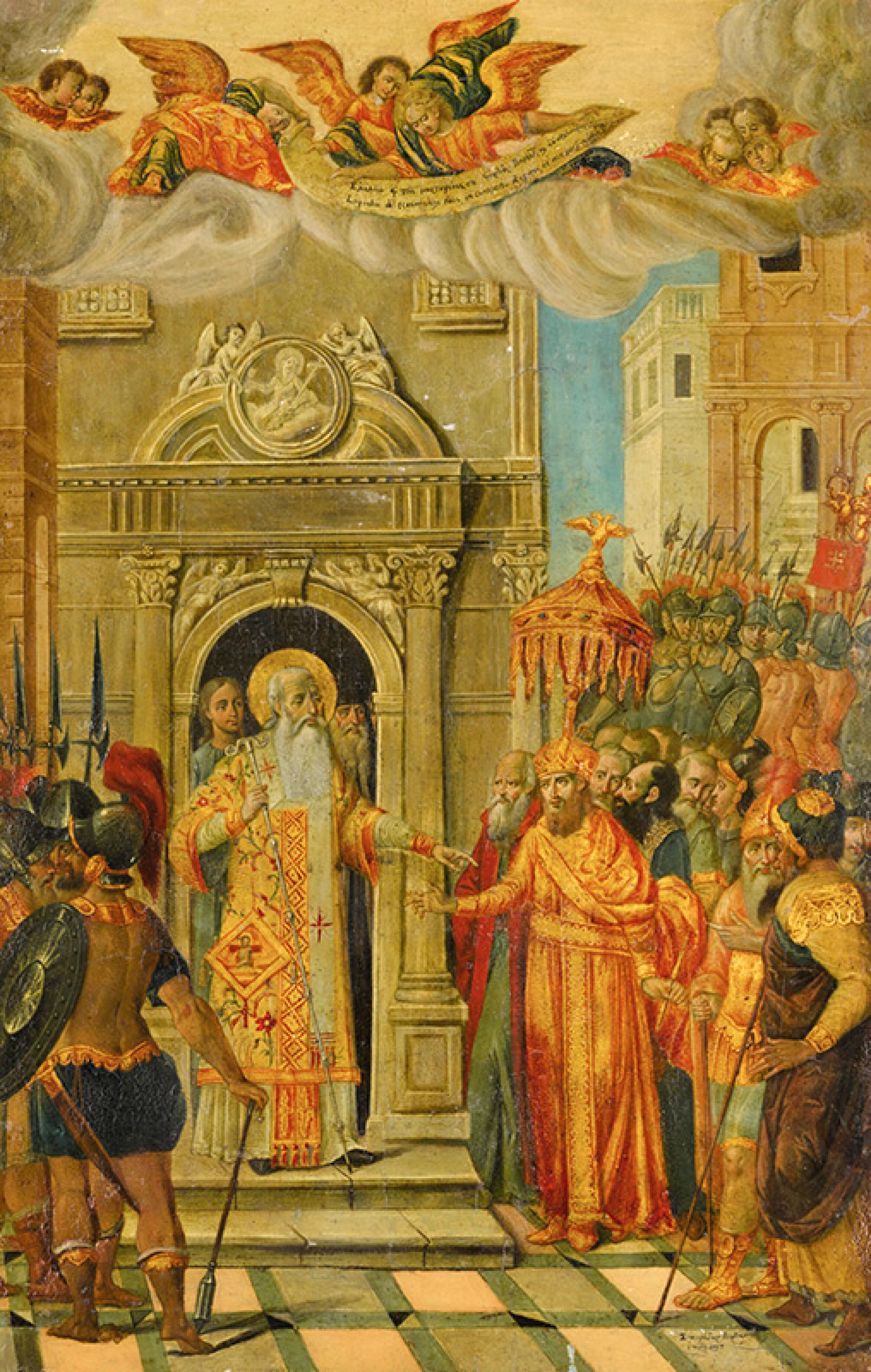
- Artist: Spyridon Ventouras
- Year: 1797
- Medium: oil on panel
- Movement: Heptanese School
- Subject: John Chrysostom Criticizing Empress Eudoxia
- Dimensions: 47 cm × 30 cm (18.5 in × 11.8 in)
- Owner: Private Collector

A Scene from the Life of John Chrysostom is an oil painting created by Greek Painter Spyridon Ventouras. He was a representative of the Heptanese School. He was active on the Ionian island Lefkada. He traveled to Venice and studied painting at the Accademia di Belle Arti di Venezia. He had an active career for approximately fifty-five years. His activity ranged from 1780 to 1835. The Institute of Neohellenic Research cataloged over sixty of his paintings. Five of them were portraits.

Painters from the island of Lefkada adopted a theme related to the life of John Chrysostom the Patriarch of Constantinople and the feud he had with the Roman Empress Aelia Eudoxia. He was one of the church clergy that disliked paganism and destroyed priceless historical ancient Greek monuments. He inadvertently roused a mob that destroyed one of the Seven Wonders of the Ancient World, for the second and final time. The monument was the Temple of Artemis. Ironically he appears in countless works of art. He accused Aelia Eudoxia of paganism. He was exiled several times.

He was one of the founders of the early Christian Church and one of the most important authors. He wrote over 700 sermons, biblical commentaries, moral discourses, and theological treatises. Numerous artists have depicted his feud with Aelia Eudoxia. Painters from the island of Lefkada adopted the theme. Three Greek painters created similar works. Makarios Lefkas, Spyridon Venturas, and Stylianos Devaris. The actual event is John Criticizing Empress Eudoxia. In this version, the empress is not present but a messenger communicates with John. The same messenger holding an umbrella was behind her in earlier versions of the painting from which she appears. The work was sold by Sotheby's in London on November 11, 2008, to a private collector.

== Description ==
The materials used were oil paint and wood panel. The height of the work is 47 cm (18.5 in) and the width is 30 cm (11.8 in). The Makarios Lefkas and Stylianos Devaris works are very similar. The orientation of the figures and structures are similar in all three works. The main character John Chrysostom is dressed differently. He has a long beard. Ventouras decided to distinguish himself from his predecessors. The messenger's position is also different. The first two paintings allude to the nature of the story and who is wearing the unique umbrella on his head. He was part of Aelia Eudoxia's entourage. He was an important figure possibly a representative of religious leadership due to the double-headed eagle on the umbrella. Recall that Chrysostom was exiled multiple times by the Empress. The painting represents one of his exiles. In this case, the Empress sent the religious leadership.

Ventouras painted his figures with oil paint instead of the typical tempera paint. Most of the same characters appear in all three works. All three paintings share cangiante. The soldiers on the left exhibit lavish Roman costumes. The painter attempts to display the realism of the natural human figures with flesh tones and shadows. The soldiers relay the artist's knowledge of painting the human anatomy. The artist also painted each figure's costumes with elegant patterns and radiant colors. The costumes establish the severity of the scene and relay an authoritative serious atmosphere. The artist extends the tiled floor and tries to add more dimension to his painting. The artists of the Heptanese School began to adopt a bright orange color. The orange style of the Heptanese School is reflective of the Italian Renaissance cangiante. The color can be seen in multiple works of the Heptanese School. The work bears the signature of the artist.

== Gallery ==
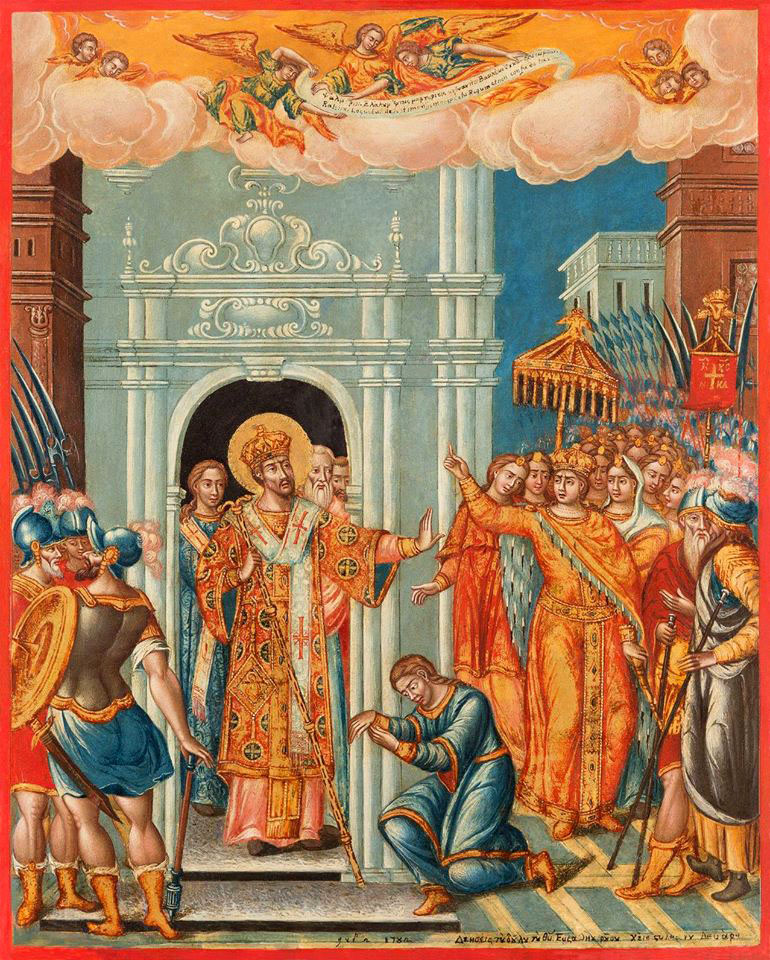
John Chrysostom Devaris

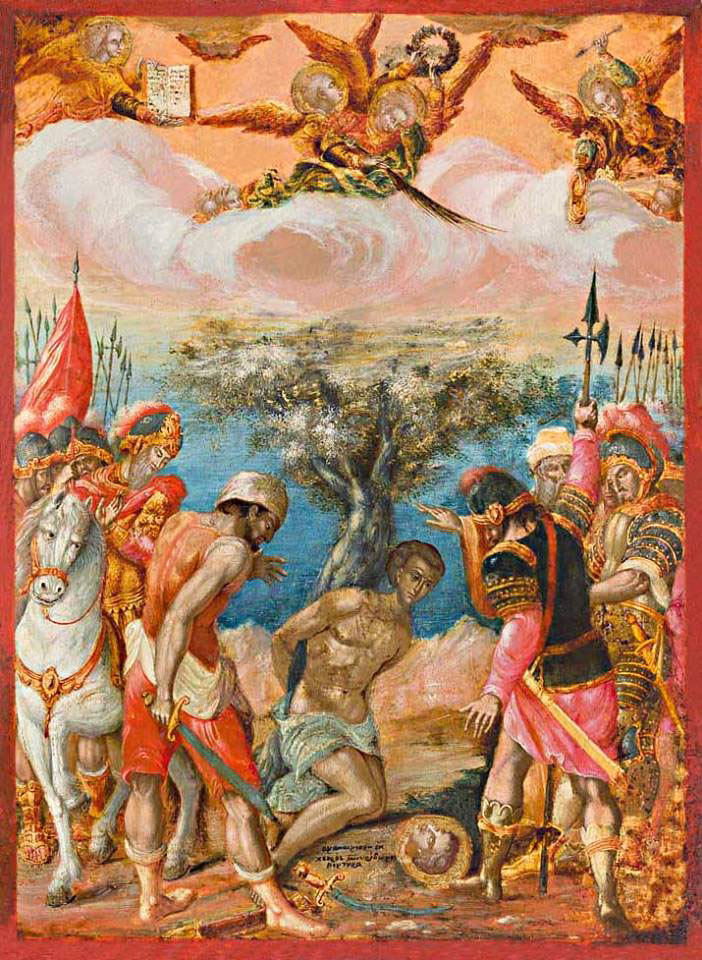
Orange style Ventouras

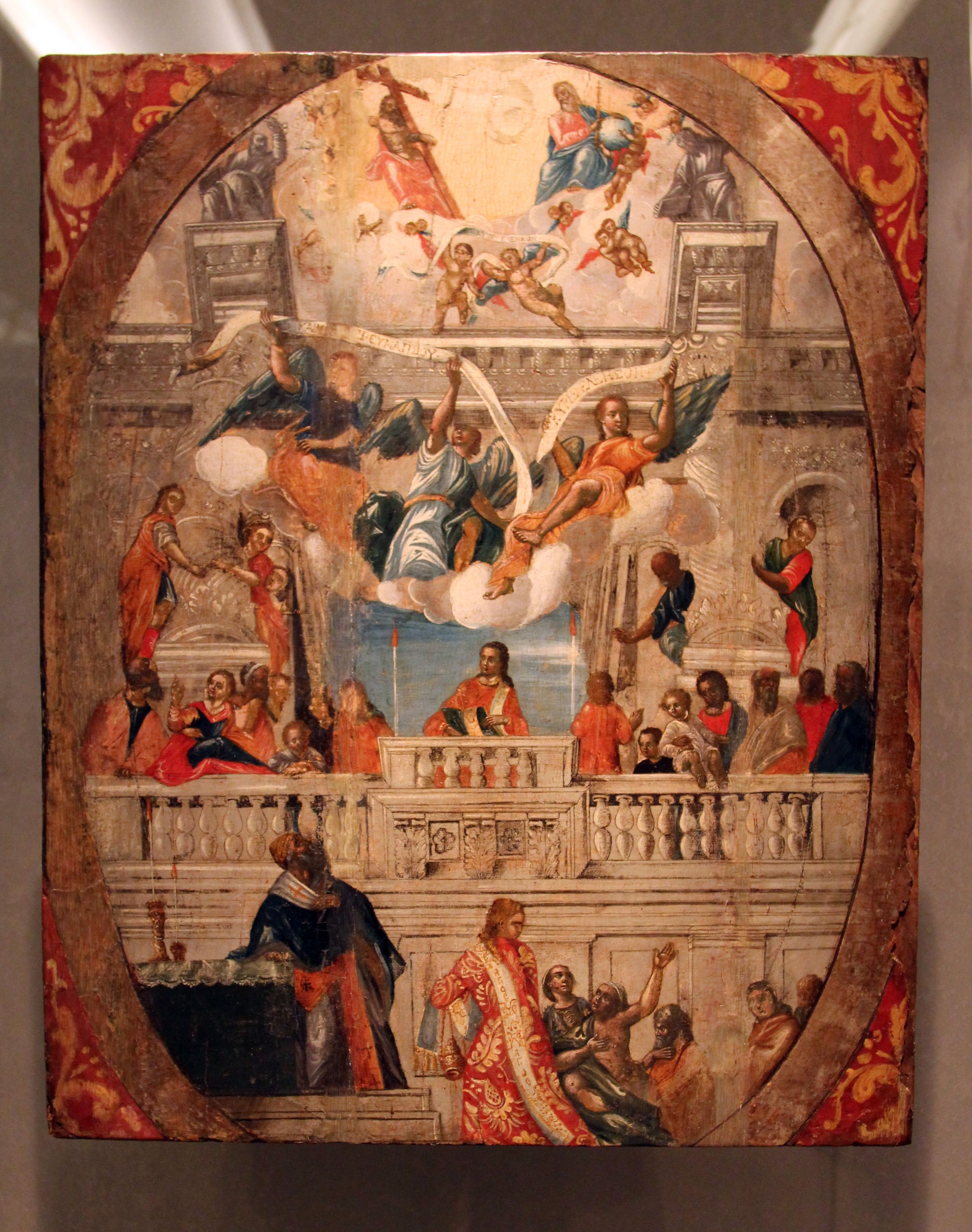
Orange style Doxaras
