= Christ Enthroned (Tzanes) =

Painting by Emmanuel Tzanes

- Ο Χριστός Ένθρονος (Greek), Cristo in Trono (Italian)
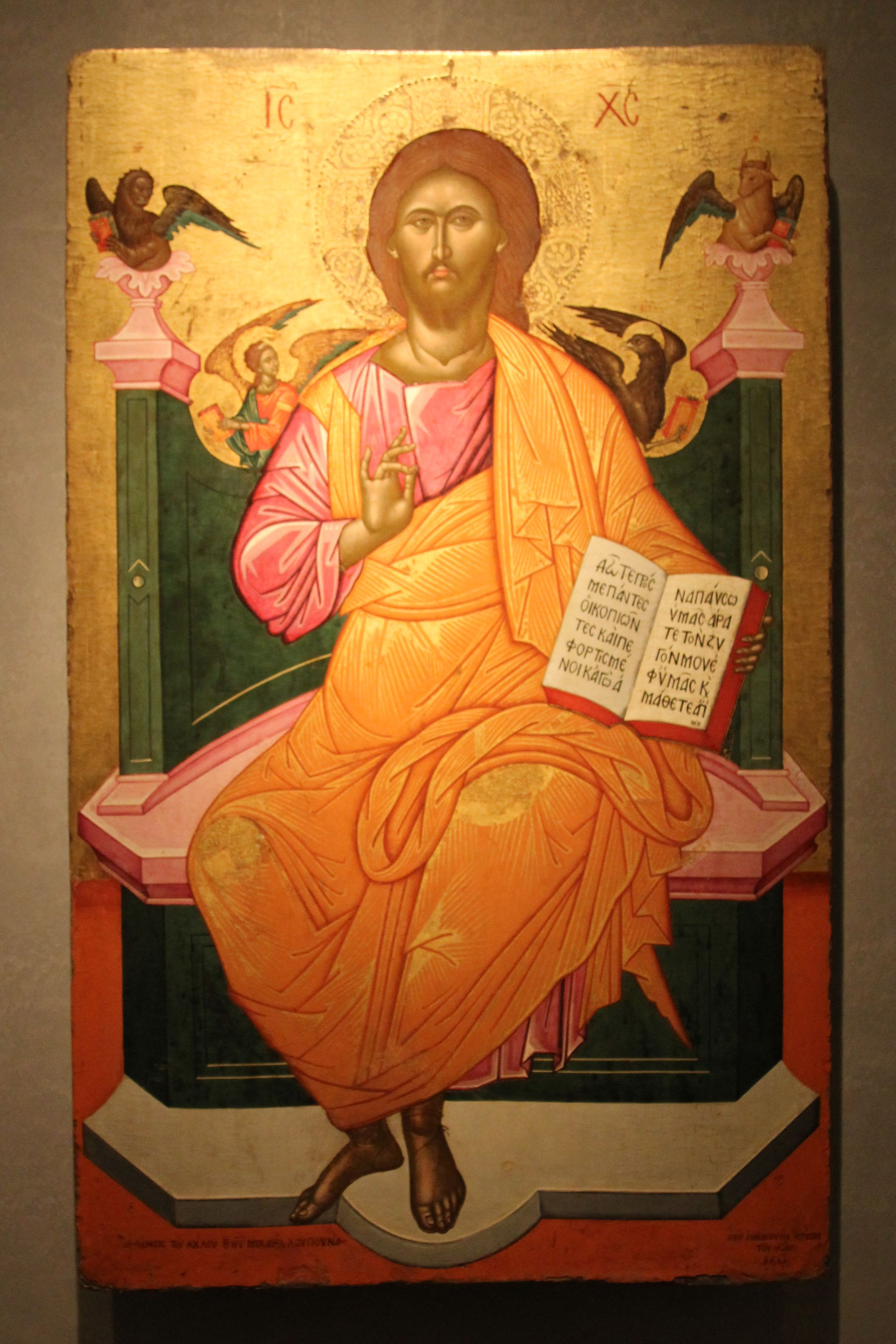
- Artist: Emmanuel Tzanes
- Year: c. 1664
- Medium: tempera on wood
- Movement: Late Cretan school
- Subject: Christ Enthroned with the four evangelical symbols
- Dimensions: 106 cm × 66 cm (41.7 in × 25.9 in)
- Location: Byzantine and Christian Museum, Athens, Greece
- Owner: Byzantine and Christian Museum

Christ Enthroned is a tempera icon by Emmanuel Tzanes, a Greek painter of the late Cretan school. It is currently at the Byzantine & Christian Museum in Athens.

Tzanes was active for most of the 17th century, and has left 130 extant works. Born in Rethymno, Crete, he migrated to Corfu around 1646. In the 1650s he moved again, to Venice, where he became the priest of San Giorgio dei Greci.

Depictions of Christ enthroned were common among Italian and Greek Byzantine painters, who produced many versions of the theme. Tzanes's composition includes symbols of the Four Evangelists around the throne, making it a notable example of a pairing which occurs frequently in paintings of the Cretan and Heptanese schools. Angelos Akotantos gathered together Jesus and the Evangelists themselves in his 15th-century painting Christ the Vine; the Evangelists' symbols appear in the Enthroned Christs of Spyridon Ventouras and Stylianos Devaris.

== Description ==
Christ Enthroned is executed with egg tempera and gold leaf on a wooden panel. Its height is 106 cm (41.7 in) and its width is 66 cm (25.9 in). The work was finished in 1664.

Set upon a shallow stage, the figures are constructed with substance, dimensionality, and complexity. The painting resembles Angelos Akotantos's treatment of the same subject, being of equivalent height and employing similar colors for the throne and costume of Jesus. Tzanes made the tunic pink instead of red, and widened the throne, creating more space for the celestial figure. The folds of the tunic and mantle exhibit clear lines, grooves, and edges.

Symmetrically arranged around Jesus are symbols representing the Four Evangelists. Two appear atop the pyramidal supports for the back of the throne: the winged animal to our left is the lion of Saint Mark, and the winged ox or bull on our right symbolizes Luke the Evangelist. To our left, above Jesus's shoulder, an angel appears. This is the symbol of Matthew the Evangelist. The final evangelical figure, to our right and above Jesus's other shoulder, is the eagle of John the Evangelist. All four symbolic figures are depicted with books, and Jesus also has an open book resting on his lap. The pairing of the Evangelists with Christ in Majesty became a familiar motif in the art of the Heptanese school.

== Gallery ==
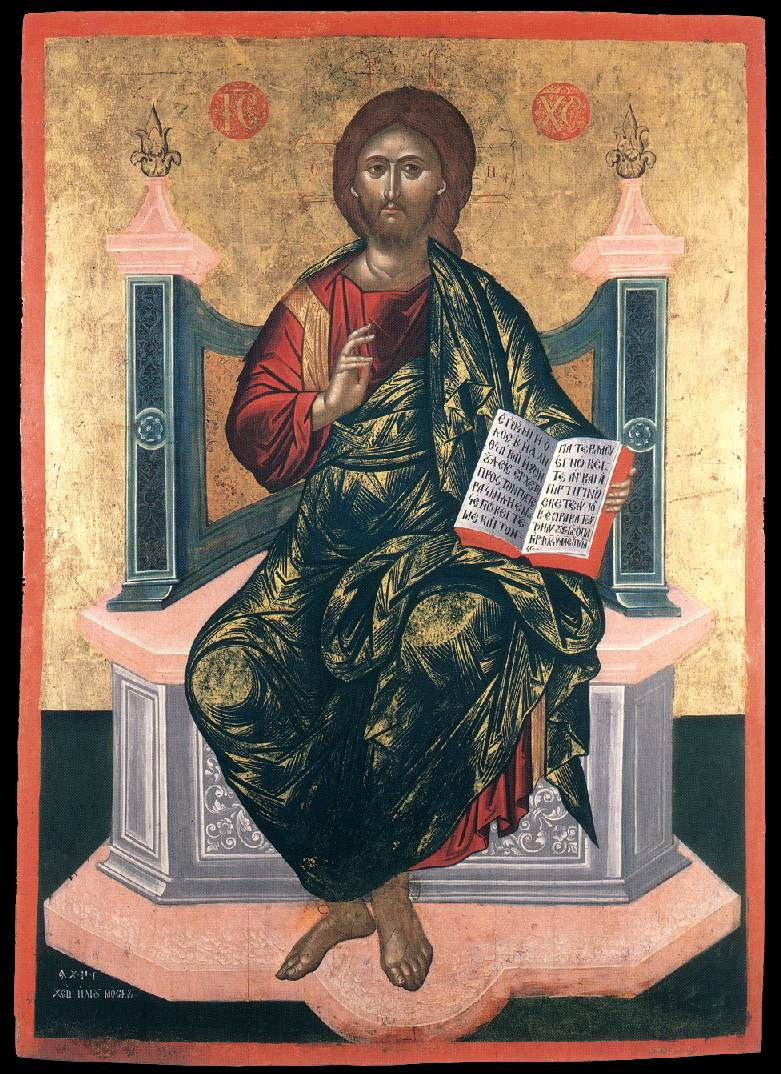
Christ Enthroned (Moskos)

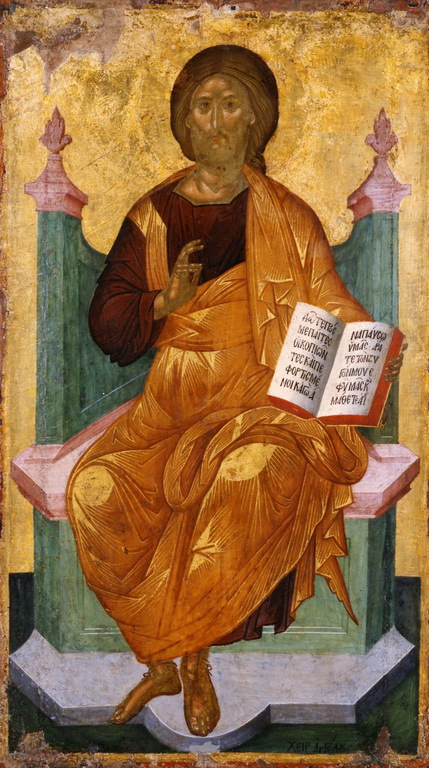
Christ Enthroned (Angelos)

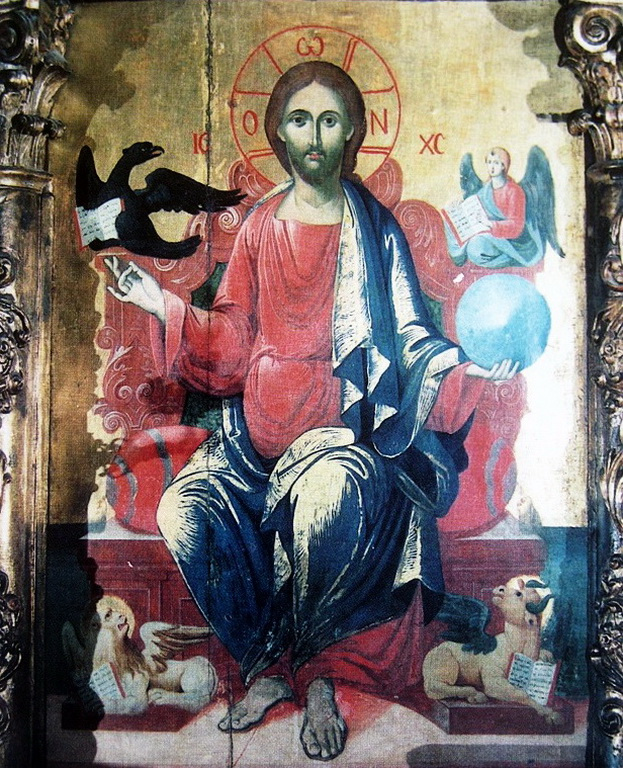
Christ Enthroned (Ventouras)
