= Boa Ventura =

Boa Ventura, Portuguese for Bonaventure, may refer to the following places:

- Boa Ventura, Paraíba, Brazil
- Boa Ventura de São Roque, Paraná, Brazil
- Boaventura, São Vicente, a parish in the municipality of São Vicente, Madeira, Portugal
