= Ventouras =

Ventouras (Greek: Βεντούρας) is a Greek form of the Italian surname Ventura. Notable people with the surname include:

- Nikolaos Ventouras (1899–1990), Greek artist and engraver
- Spyridon Ventouras (1761–1835), Greek painter, professor and architect
