= The Holy Towel (Tzanes) =

1659 painting by Emmanuel Tzanes

- Ιερό Μανδήλιο (Greek), Velo della Veronica (Italian)
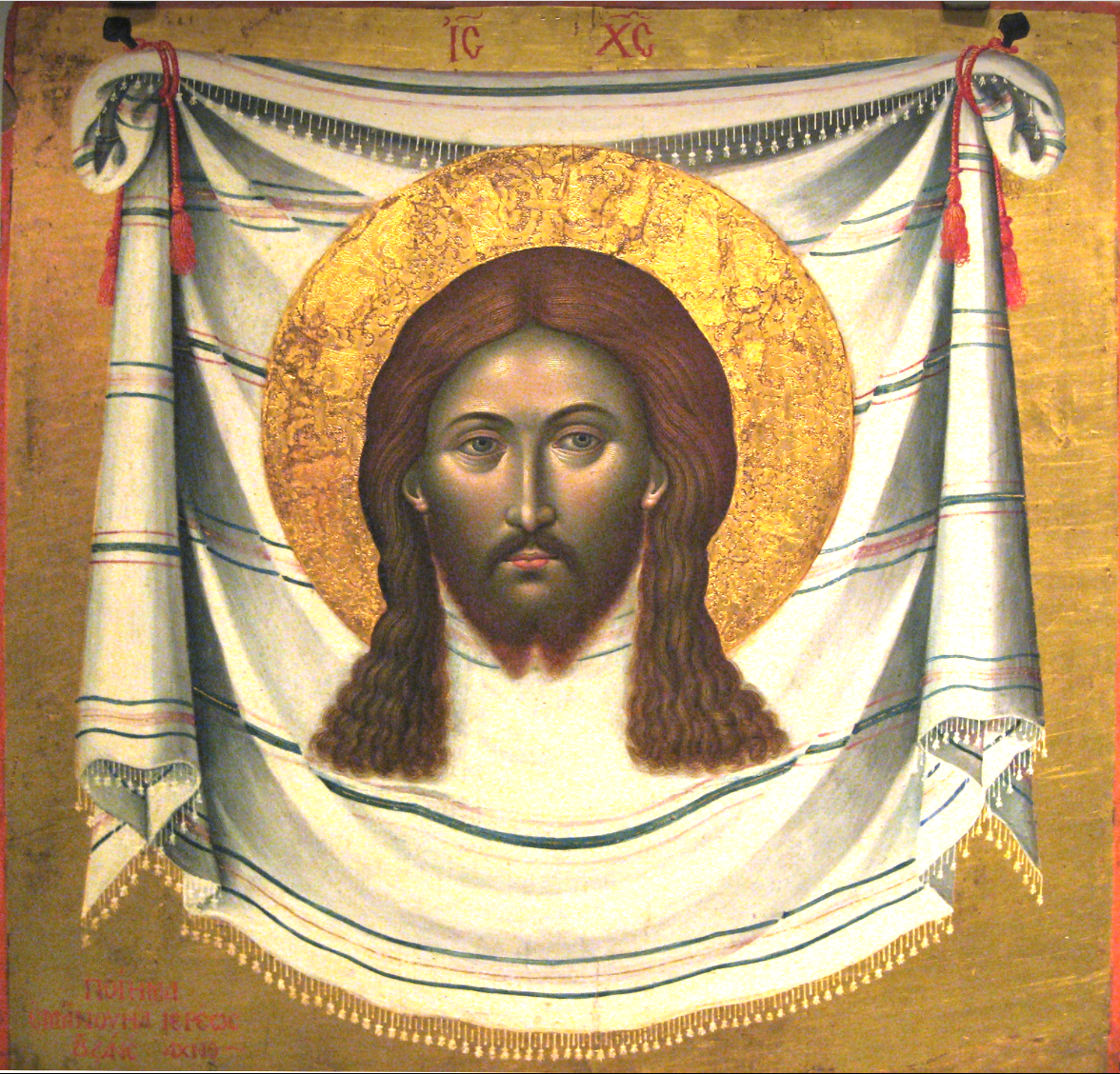
- Artist: Emmanuel Tzanes
- Year: 1659
- Medium: tempera on wood
- Movement: Heptanese School
- Subject: Holy Towel
- Dimensions: 47.5 cm × 46 cm (18.7 in × 18.1 in)
- Location: Benaki Museum, Athens, Greece
- Owner: Benaki Museum
- Accession: 26097

The Holy Towel is a tempera painting completed in 1659 by Emmanuel Tzanes. He was a representative of the Late Cretan School and the Heptanese school. His brothers were the painter and poet Marinos Tzanes and the painter Konstantinos Tzanes. One hundred thirty works of art are attributed to Emmanuel. He is one of the most important Greek painters of the 17th century along with Theodoros Poulakis. He was from Rethymno Crete. He was active from 1625 to 1690. He was the priest of San Giorgio dei Greci in Venice for thirty years.

Many different objects related to the story of Jesus's life were sought after by adherents of the faith. The Holy Grail, Spear of Destiny and the Holy Shroud are some of the important relics. Painters began to adopt the different objects into their works. Many Greek-Italian Byzantine works of art featured the Shroud of Turin (Holy Towel) or Veil of Veronica. El Greco completed several versions. The subject was very common in the Cretan School. Angelos Pitzamanos and Theophanes the Cretan also incorporated the subject matter into their works. A notable version was completed by Tzanes.

The Holy Towel was painted in Venice and finished in 1659. One year after the work was finished he became the priest of San Giorgio dei Greci. The painting is part of the collection of the Benaki Museum in Athens, Greece.

== Description ==
The work of art was created using wood panel, tempera paint, and gold leaf. The height is 47.5 cm (18.7 in) and the width is 46 cm (18.1 in). The artist signed and dated the work in the left-hand corner.

== Gallery ==
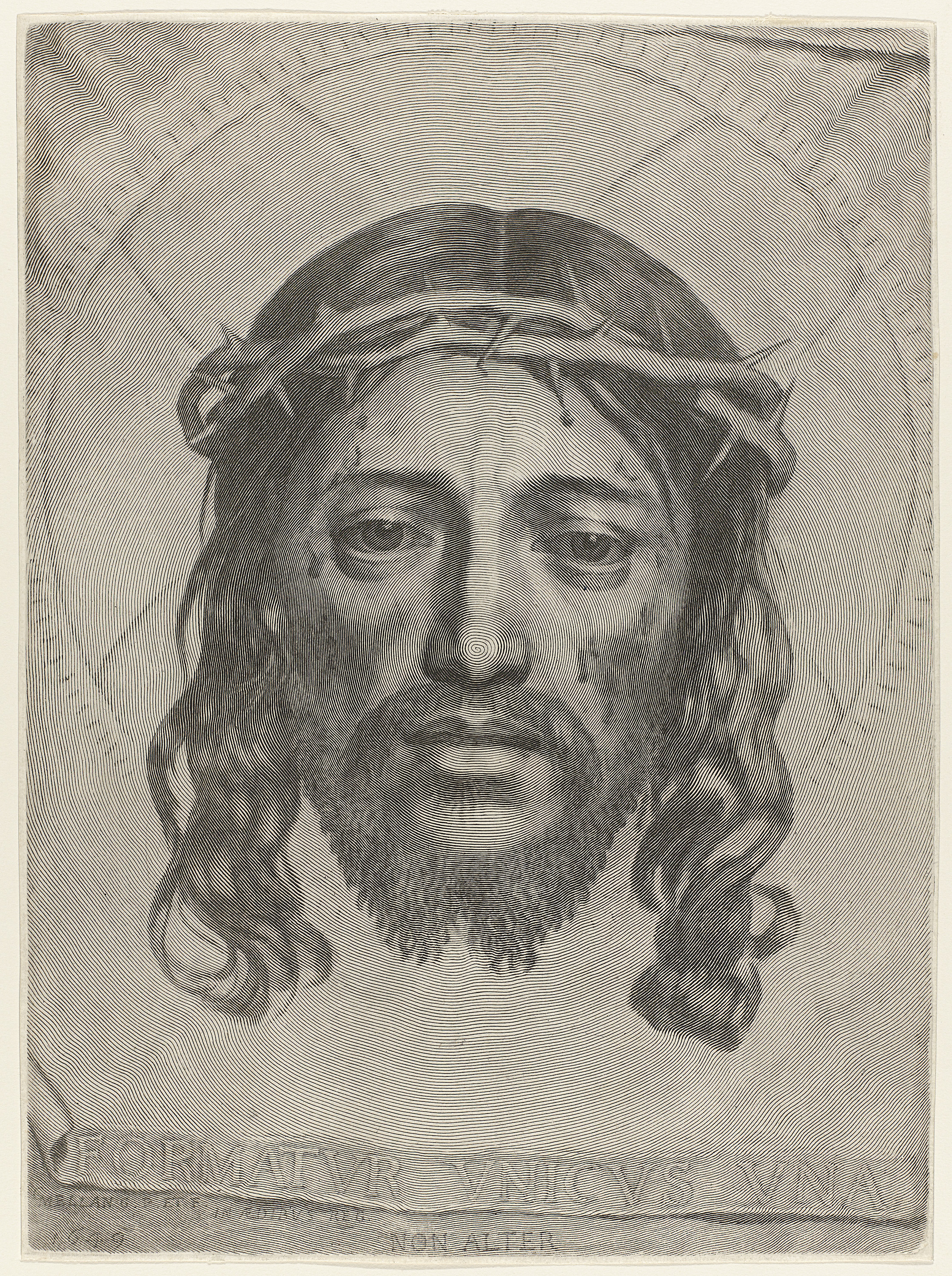
Claude Mellan Holy Towel

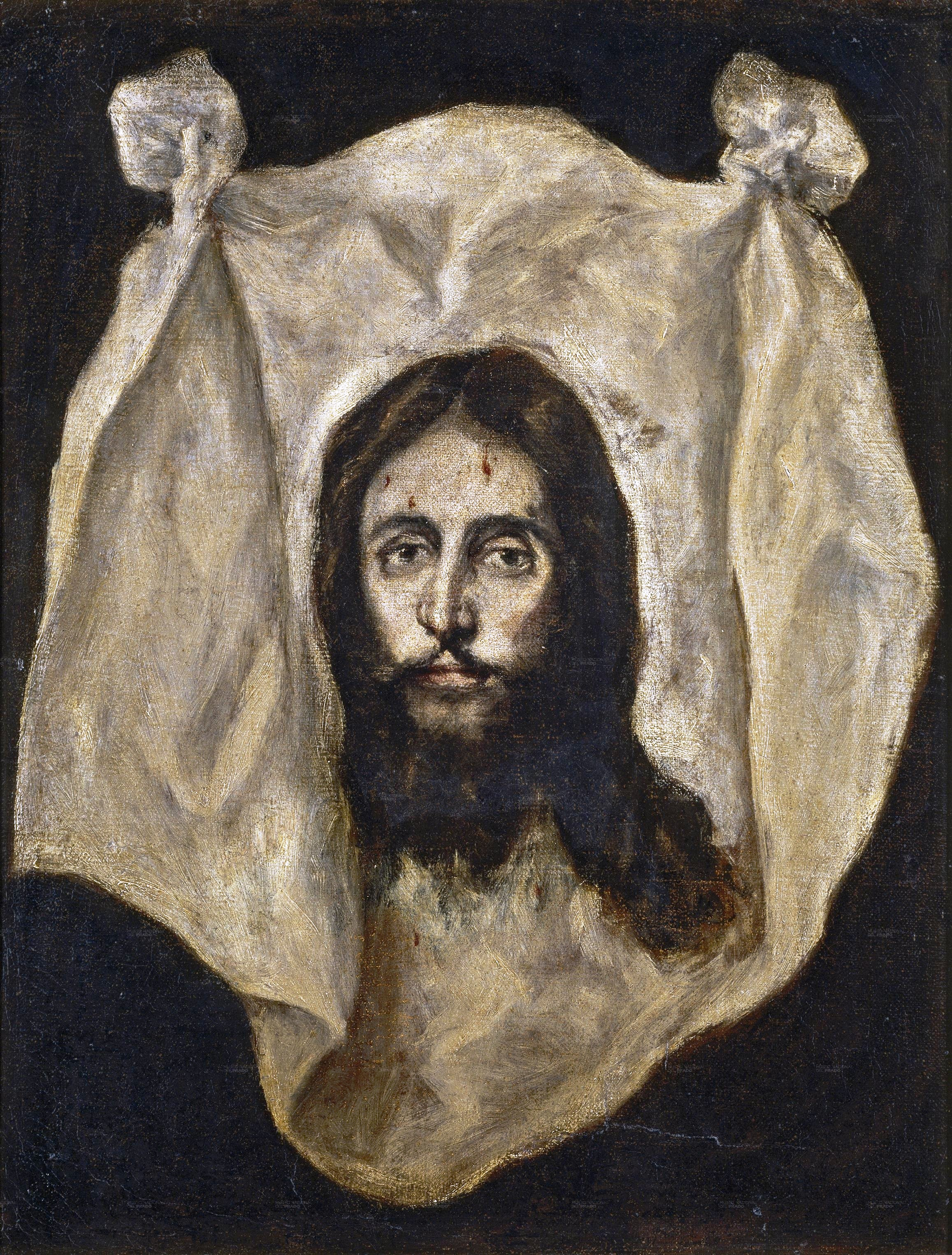
El Greco Holy Towel

== Bibliography ==
- Hatzidakis, Manolis; Drakopoulou, Evgenia (1997). Έλληνες Ζωγράφοι μετά την Άλωση (1450-1830). Τόμος 2: Καβαλλάρος - Ψαθόπουλος [Greek Painters after the Fall of Constantinople (1450-1830). Volume 2: Kavallaros - Psathopoulos]. Athens: Center for Modern Greek Studies, National Research Foundation. hdl:10442/14088. ISBN 960-7916-00-X.
