= Saint Onuphrius (Tzanes) =

Painting by Emmanuel Tzanes

- Ὀνούφριος (Greek), Sant'Onofrio (Italian)
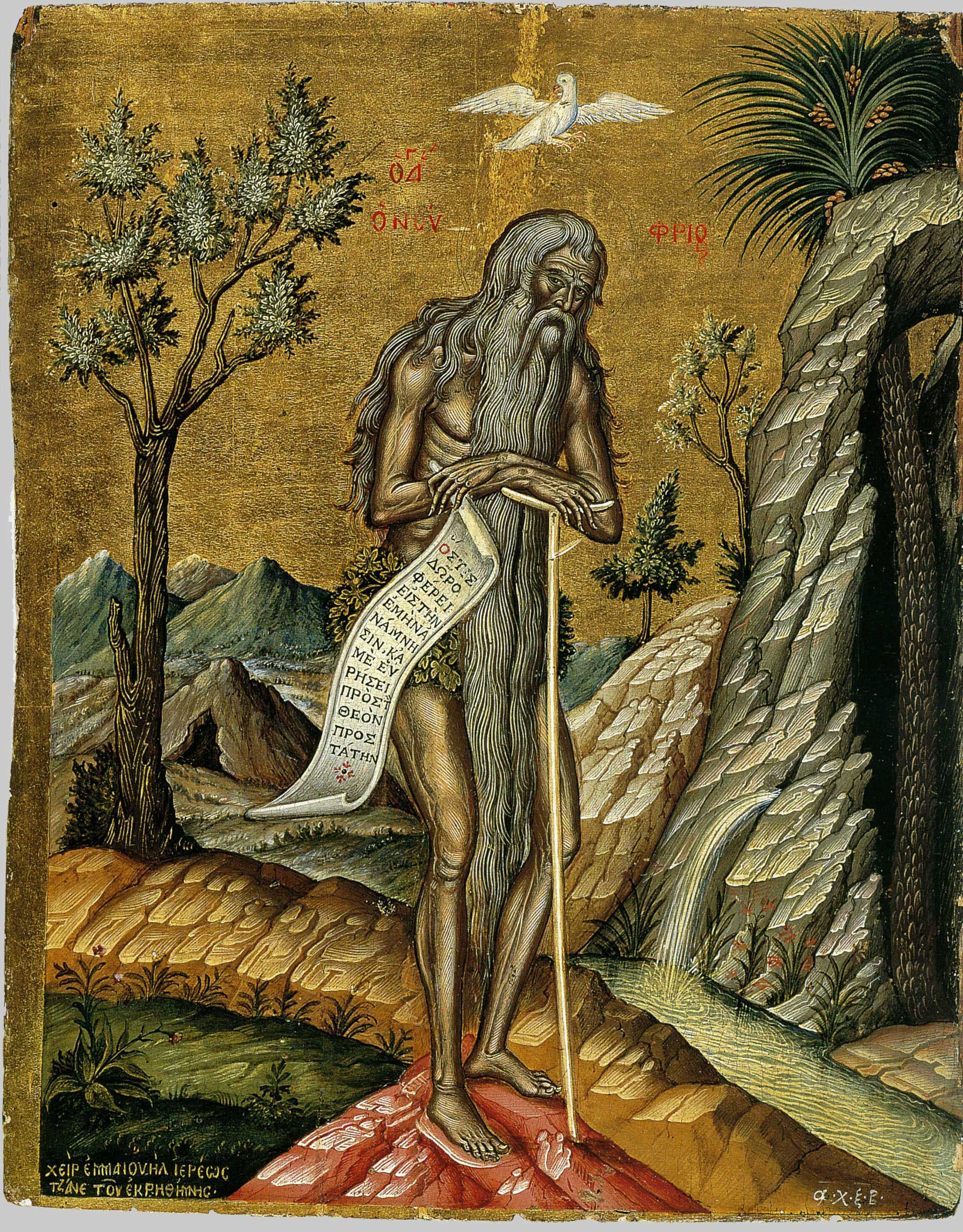
- Artist: Emmanuel Tzanes
- Year: 1662
- Medium: tempera on wood
- Movement: Heptanese School
- Subject: Saint Onuphrius
- Dimensions: 31.4 cm × 24.8 cm (12.4 in × 9.8 in)
- Location: Benaki Museum, Athens, Greece
- Owner: The Rena Andreadis Icon Collection

Saint Onuphrius is a tempera painting created in 1662 by Emmanuel Tzanes. Tzanes is one of the most important Greek painters of the 17th century. He was active in Crete, Corfu, and Venice, Italy. Both of his brothers were painters. He has a massive art catalog attributed to him. According to the Hellenic Institute over one hundred thirty of his works survived. He belongs to the Late Cretan School and Heptanese School of painting. He was part of the movement that introduced Flemish Engravings into the Greek world.

Saint Onuphrius lived in seclusion in the desert of Upper Egypt. He was from Ethiopia. The name Onuphrius is a Hellenized version of the Coptic name Unnufer from the Egyptian word wnn-nfr meaning the perfect one. He was a monk near Thebes. He studied law and philosophy before becoming a monk. He eventually left the monastery and lived in the desert for over sixty years. The only visitor he had to his monastic cell was an angel who delivered sacred bread every night. He also ate dates from desert palm trees. During his final days on earth, he was visited by a man named Paphnutius.

When Paphnutius first saw him he was a scary wild figure covered with hair and wearing a loincloth of leaves. He frightened Paphnutius. He ran away from the scary homeless-looking man. The figure cried out: “Come down to me, man of God, for I am a man also, dwelling in the desert for the love of God.” Paphnutius followed the wild-looking half-naked man. He told him that he was a hermit living in isolation for over seventy years for God. He endured extreme discomforts such as hunger and thirst. An angel brought him to this place. Paphnutius stayed with him for the night. Bread and water miraculously appeared outside of the hermit's cell. Paphnutius recorded the story and his story. Onuphrius became a saint. He is venerated as Saint Onuphrius.

Countless artists have depicted the subject matter namely Greek, Spanish and Italian painters. An early depiction of the monk can be found in the Greek Monastery of Varlaam. Notable works were completed there by Frangos Katelanos. Different versions were also completed by Francisco Collantes and his contemporary Jusepe de Ribera. Another exceptional depiction similar to Tzane’s work was Lorenzo Lotto’s masterpiece. Onuphrius is typically depicted with wild hair, in a leafy perizoma or loincloth as depicted in his story. The masterpiece is part of the collection of Rena Andreadis in Athens Greece. The collection is frequently exhibited at the Benaki Museum.

== Description ==
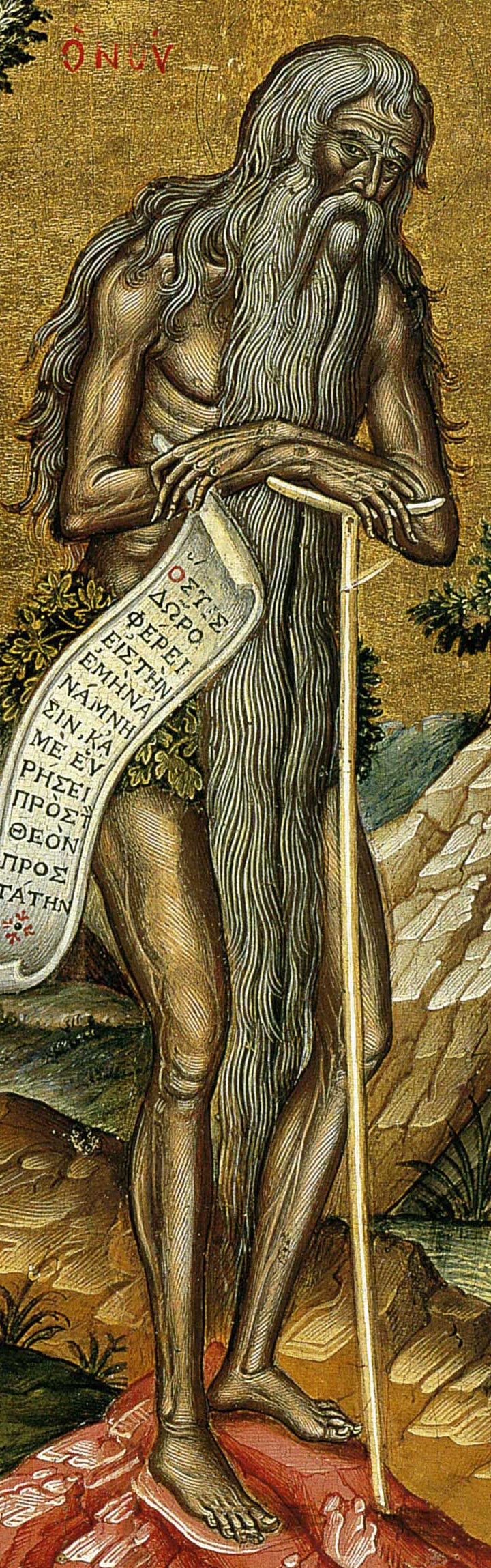
Anatomical Detail

The work is made of egg tempera paint, gold leaf, and wood panel. The height of the work is 31.5cm (12.4 in.) and the width of the work is 25cm (9.8 in.), with a thickness of 1.7cm (0.7 in.). The date given is 1662.

In 1662, two years after Tzanes became the priest at San Giorgio dei Greci in Venice, he completed the work. It is considered one of the painter's mature works. It is an example of the Cretan School and reflective of the mannerisms of the Heptanese school. At this time, artists of the Ionian Islands had begun to humanise their figures, paying closer attention to anatomy. In this painting, Onuphrius is covered in finely painted, knee-length grey and white hair. He also has clear elderly wrinkles holds a wooden cane. His ribs are clearly visible reflecting the nature of Onuphriu’s lifestyle.

The painting also features a palm tree on a mountain, a waterfall flowing from the mountain into a stream, a cave with an opening on the left, his monastic cell in the middle ground behind a tree, and three mountains in the background. A dove is also pictured, signifying the Holy Spirit.

The icon is full of Greek inscriptions. The top features the term "Ὁ ἉΓΙΟC ΟΝΟΥΦΡΙΟΣ — HO HAGIOS ONOUPHRIOS" ([The] Holy Onuphrius). Onuphrius holds a scroll with the Greek inscription: "ΟΣΤΙΣ ΔΩΡΟ[Ν] ΦΕΡΕΙ ΕΙΣ ΤΗΝ ΕΜΗΝ ΑΝΑΜΝΗΣΙΝ ΚΑΜΕ ΕΥΡΗΣΕΙ ΠΡΟΣ Τ[ΟΝ] ΘΕΟΝ ΠΡΟΣ- ΤΑΤΗΝ OSTIS DORON PHEREI EIS TEN EMEN ANAMNESIN KAME EURISEI PROS TON THEON PROSTATEN" (Who a gift brings in my memory, will find me a protector/patron before God). The artist also signed his work: "ΧΕΙΡ ΕΜΜΑΝΟΥΗΛ ἹΕΡΕΩC ΤΖΑΝΕ ΤΟΥ ΕΚ ΡΗΘΗΜΝΗC CHEIR EMMANOUEL HIEREOSTZANE TOU EK RETHEMNES" ([the] hand of Emmanuel Priest Tzane[s] the-one from Rethymnon).

== Gallery ==
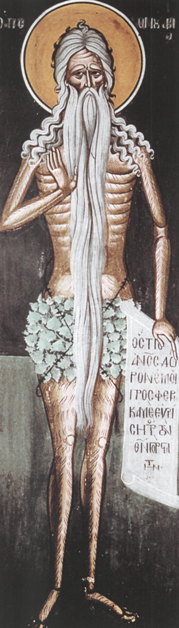
Onuphrius in Varlam Monastery

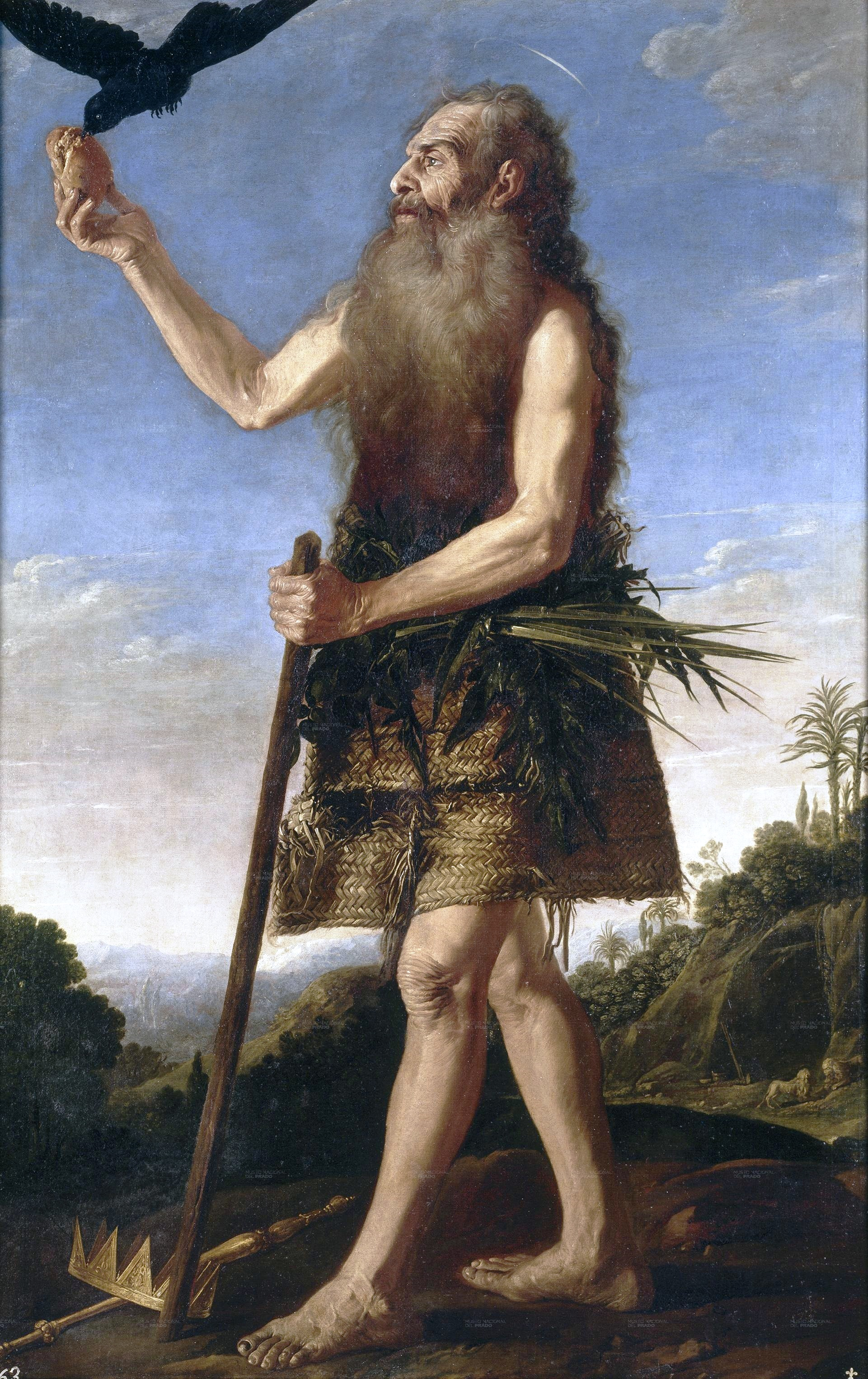
Onuphrius Collantes

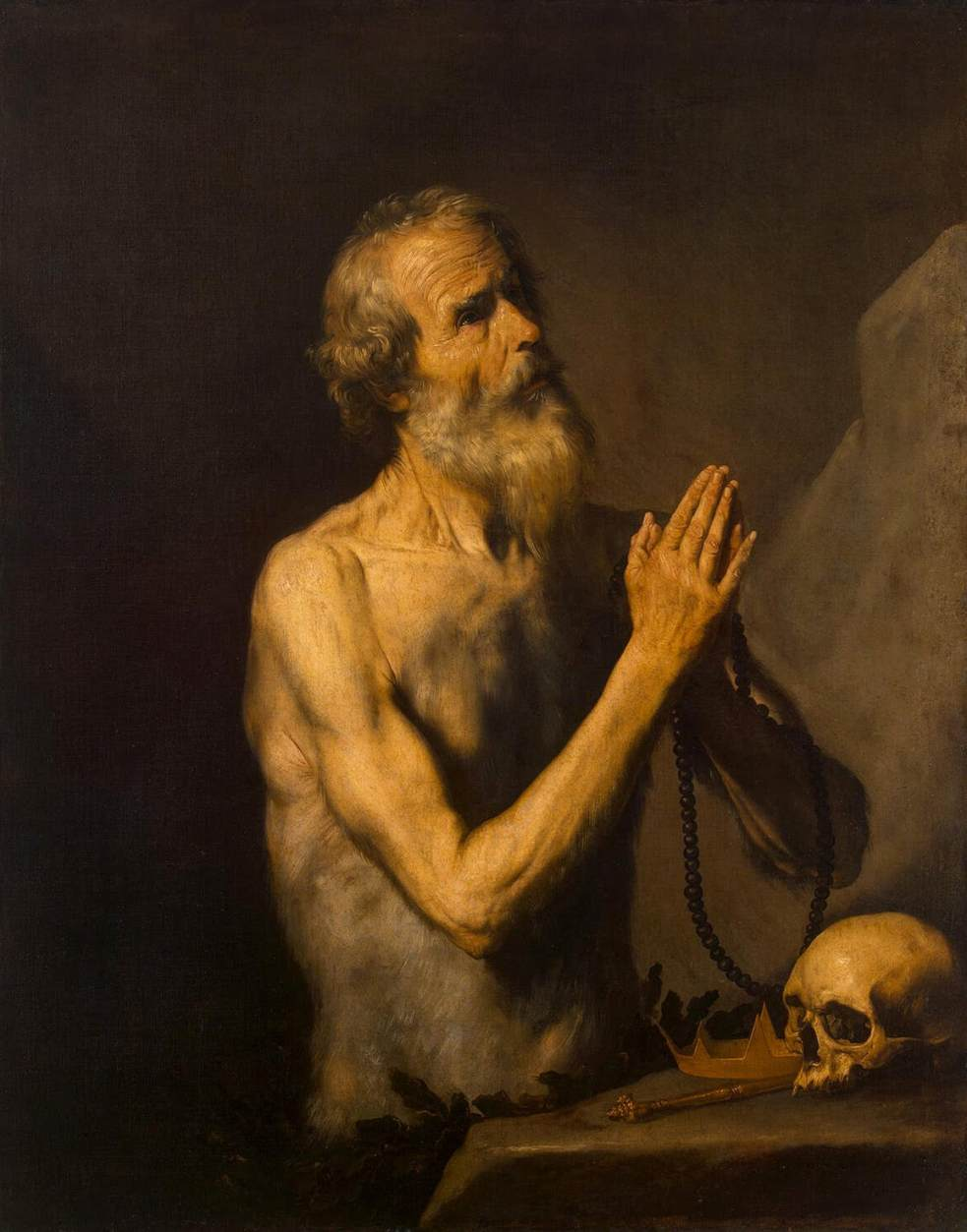
Onuphrius Jusepe de Ribera

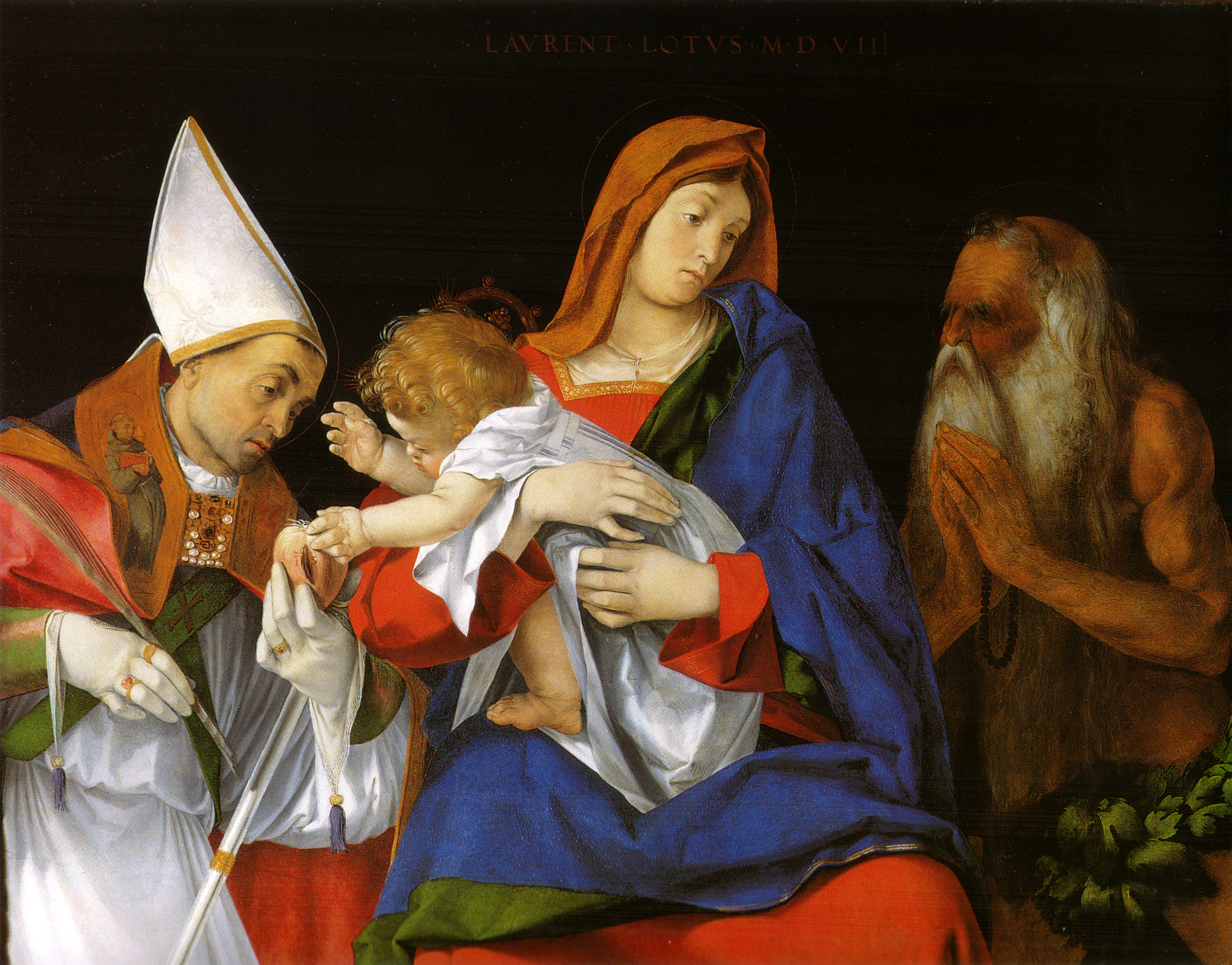
Onuphrius Lorenzo Lotto

== Bibliography ==
- Hatzidakis, Manolis; Drakopoulou, Evgenia (1997). Έλληνες Ζωγράφοι μετά την Άλωση (1450-1830). Τόμος 2: Καβαλλάρος - Ψαθόπουλος [Greek Painters after the Fall of Constantinople (1450-1830). Volume 2: Kavallaros - Psathopoulos]. Athens: Center for Modern Greek Studies, National Research Foundation. hdl:10442/14088. ISBN 960-7916-00-X.
- Drandaki, Anastasia (2002). Εικόνες, 14ος-18ος Αιώνας. Συλλογή Ρενα Ανδρεάδη [Greek Icons 14th-18th century The Rena Andreadis Collection]. Athens: Benaki Museum. ISBN 88-8491-109-5.
- Butler, Alban; Burns, Paul (2000). Butler's Lives of the Saints. London: Continuum International Publishing Group. ISBN 0814623883.
