= Emmanuel Tzanes =

Greek Renaissance painter (1610–1690)

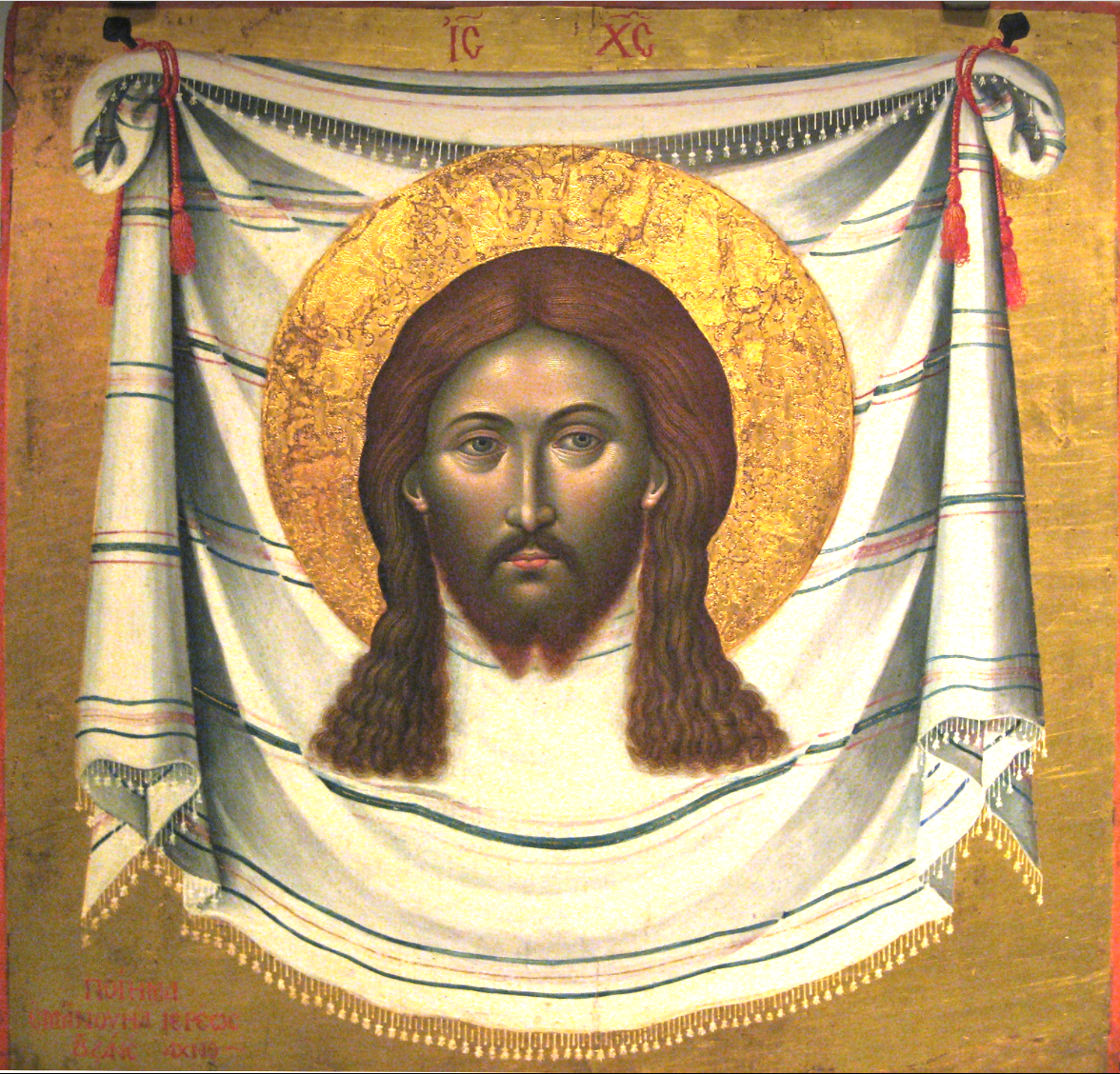
- The Holy Towel
- Born: 1610; Rethymno, Crete, Republic of Venice
- Died: March 28, 1690 (aged 79–80); Venice, Republic of Venice
- Movement: Cretan school Heptanese school

Emmanuel Tzanes (Greek: Εμμανουήλ Τζάνες; 1610 – 28 March 1690), also known as Bounialis (Greek: Μπουνιαλής), Emmanuel Tzane-Bounialis, Emmanuel Zane, or Emmanuel Tzane, was a Greek Renaissance iconographer, author, clergyman, and educator. He spent the latter half of his life in Venice, where he was parish priest of the church of San Giorgio dei Greci and a member of the Flanginian School run by the city's Greek Confraternity. Tzanes painted icons in the style of the Cretan school, influenced by contemporary trends in Venetian painting. His known extant works, over 130 in number, can be found in public foundations, private collections, churches and monasteries in Greece. The most popular of these is The Holy Towel, finished in 1659. Tzanes was a collaborator with Philotheos Skoufos, and brothers with the painter Konstantinos Tzanes and the poet Marinos Tzanes.

== History ==
Born in Rethymno, Crete, Tzanes became a priest sometime before 1637. After the Ottomans conquered Rethymno in 1646, he fled Crete and spent eight years in Corfu. Here he painted numerous icons, sometimes in collaboration with Philotheos Skoufos. Tzanes moved to Venice in early 1655, remaining there for the rest of his life. In March of that year he applied to become the priest of San Giorgio dei Greci, offering to paint the church for free, but was initially turned down in favor of Skoufos. Skoufos vacated the position in 1660 and was succeeded by Tzanes, who served for the next twenty years. During his tenure he conducted twenty-six marriages. He was also the supervisor at the Flanginian School of the Greek Confraternity in Venice.

Over one hundred and thirty paintings by Tzanes survive, dating between 1636 and 1689. He served both Catholic and Greek Orthodox clients and produced works of all sizes, from small icons and triptychs to monumental paintings and sanctuary doors. Adhering to the Cretan school style which he learned in Rethymno, his paintings are dated and often include clients' portraits. His influence can be seen in works of the later Heptanese school. Tzanes regularly painted icons of Saint Alypius the Stylite, Saint Gabdelas the Persian, Saint Demetrius on horseback, and the Virgin and Christ enthroned. His brother Konstantinos Tzanes was also a painter and lived in Venice with him.

== Gallery ==
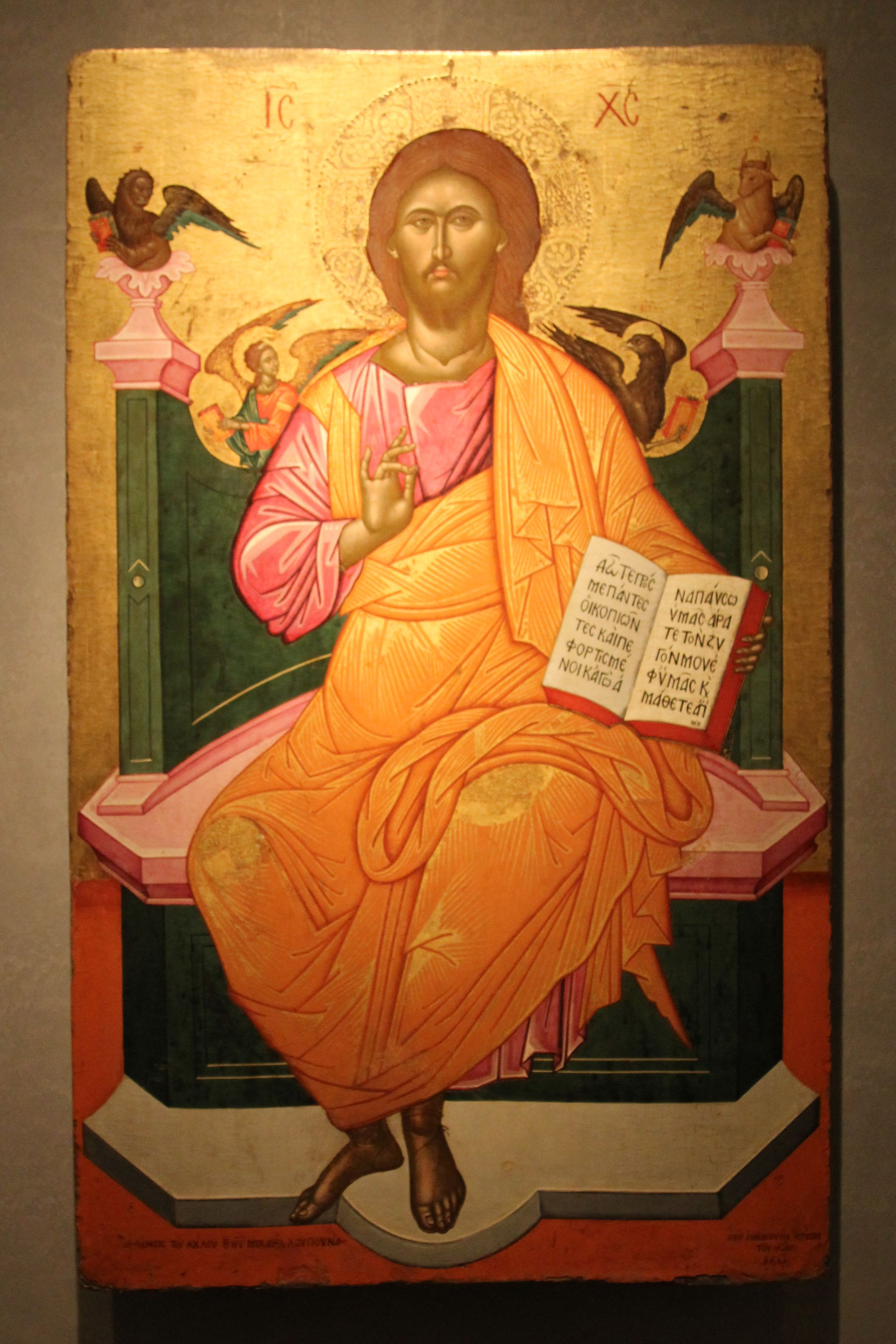
Christ Enthroned

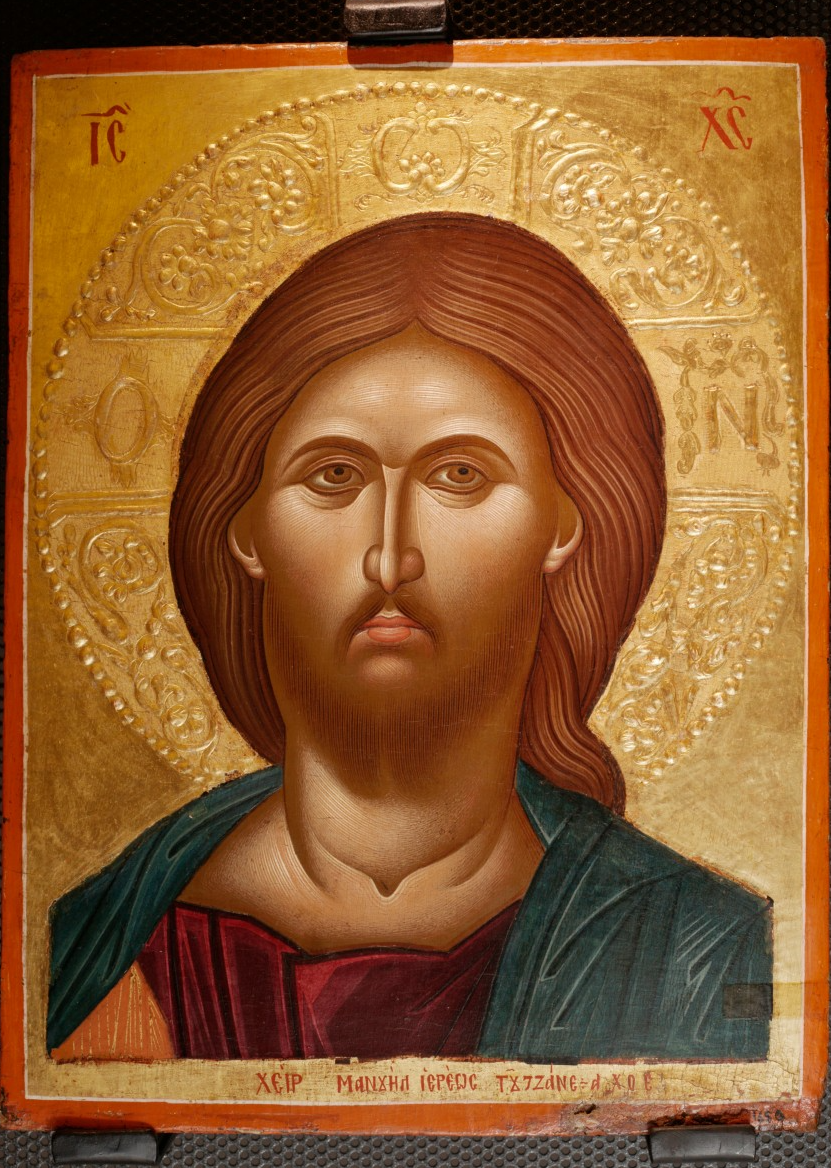
Jesus Christ

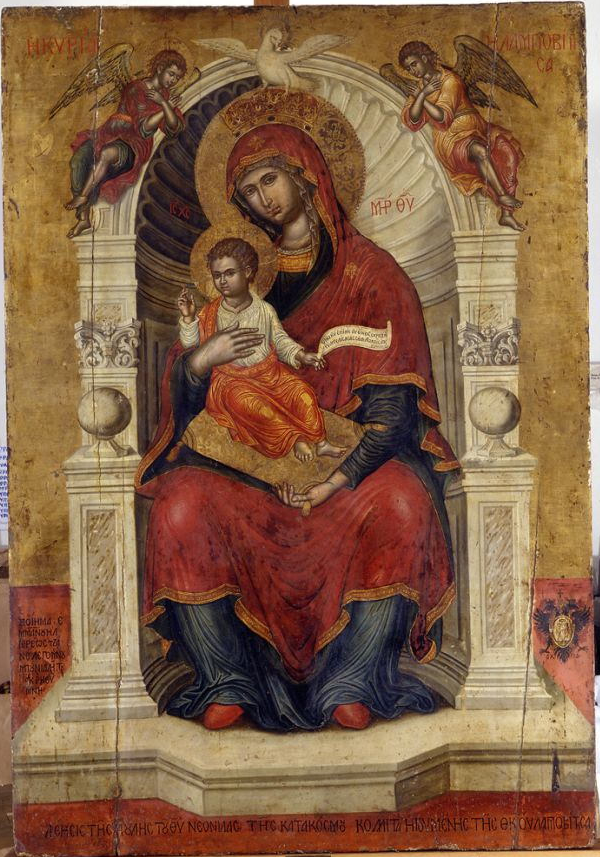
Virgin and Child

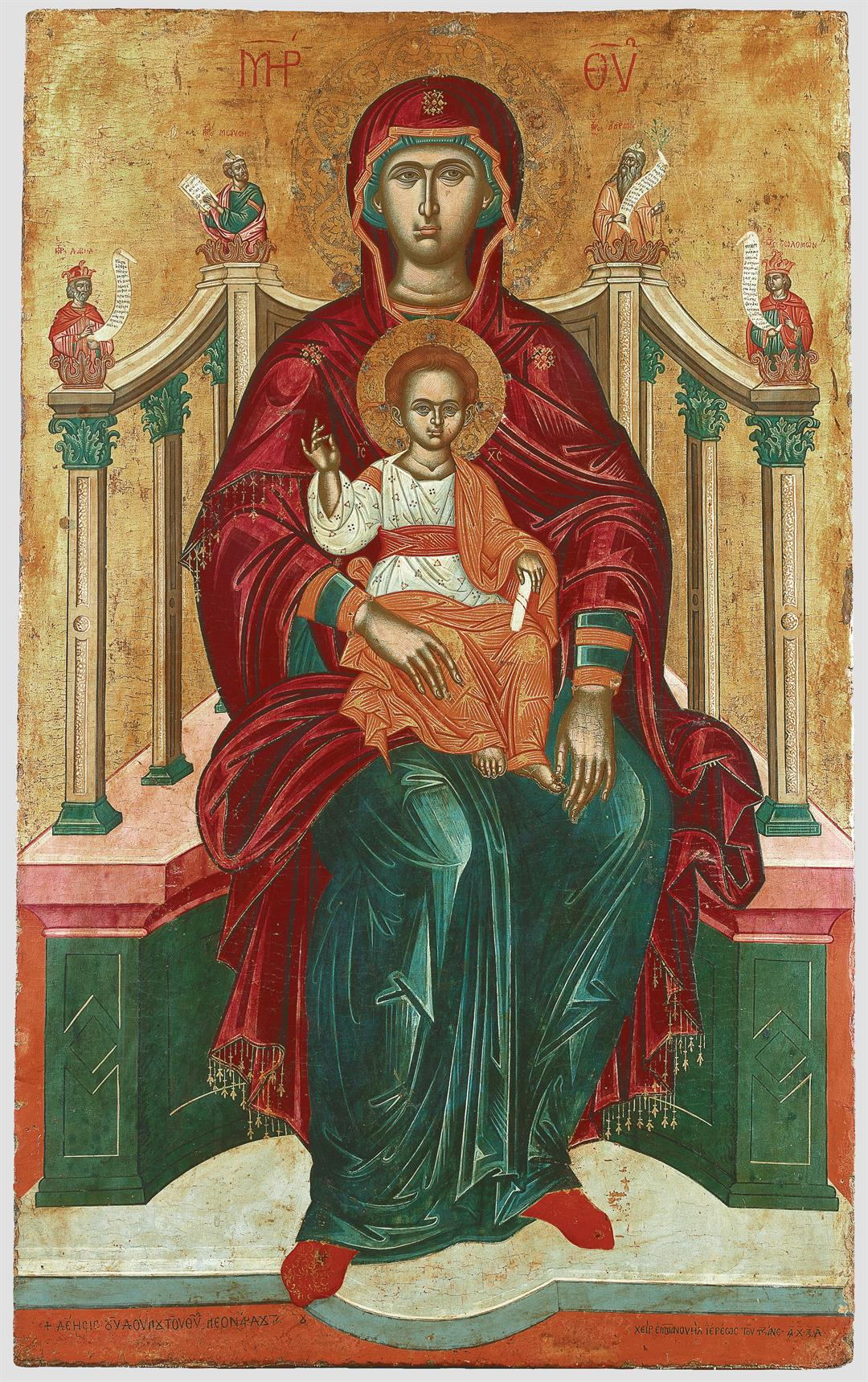
Virgin and Child

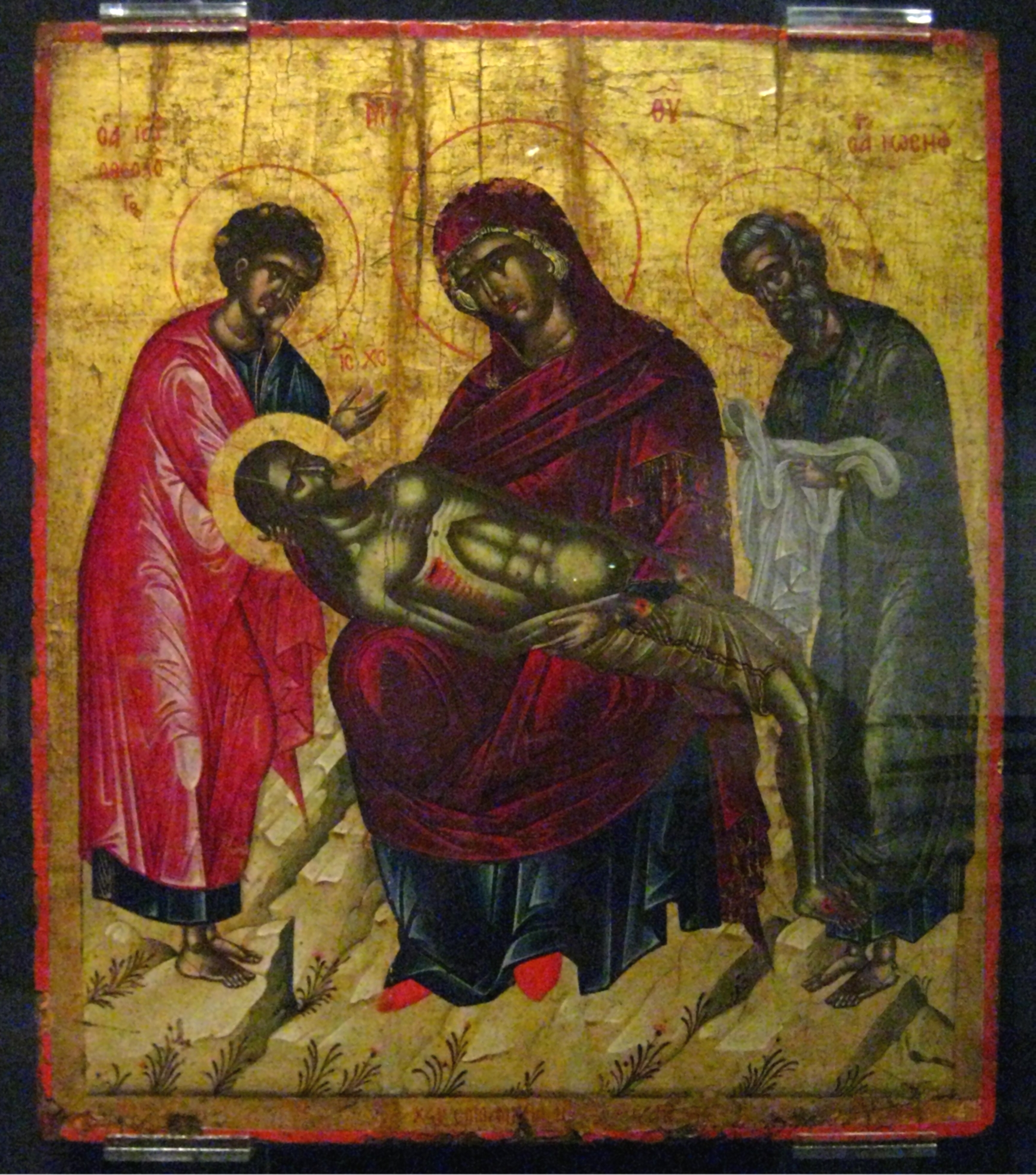
Lamentation

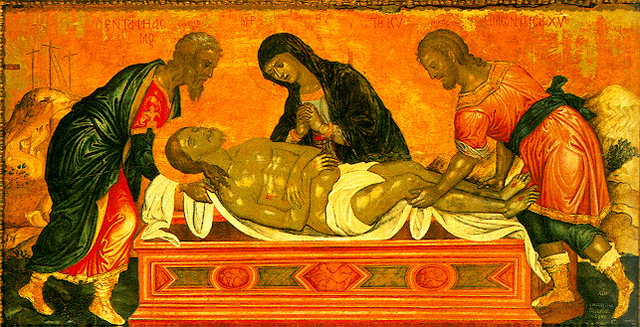
Lamentation of Christ

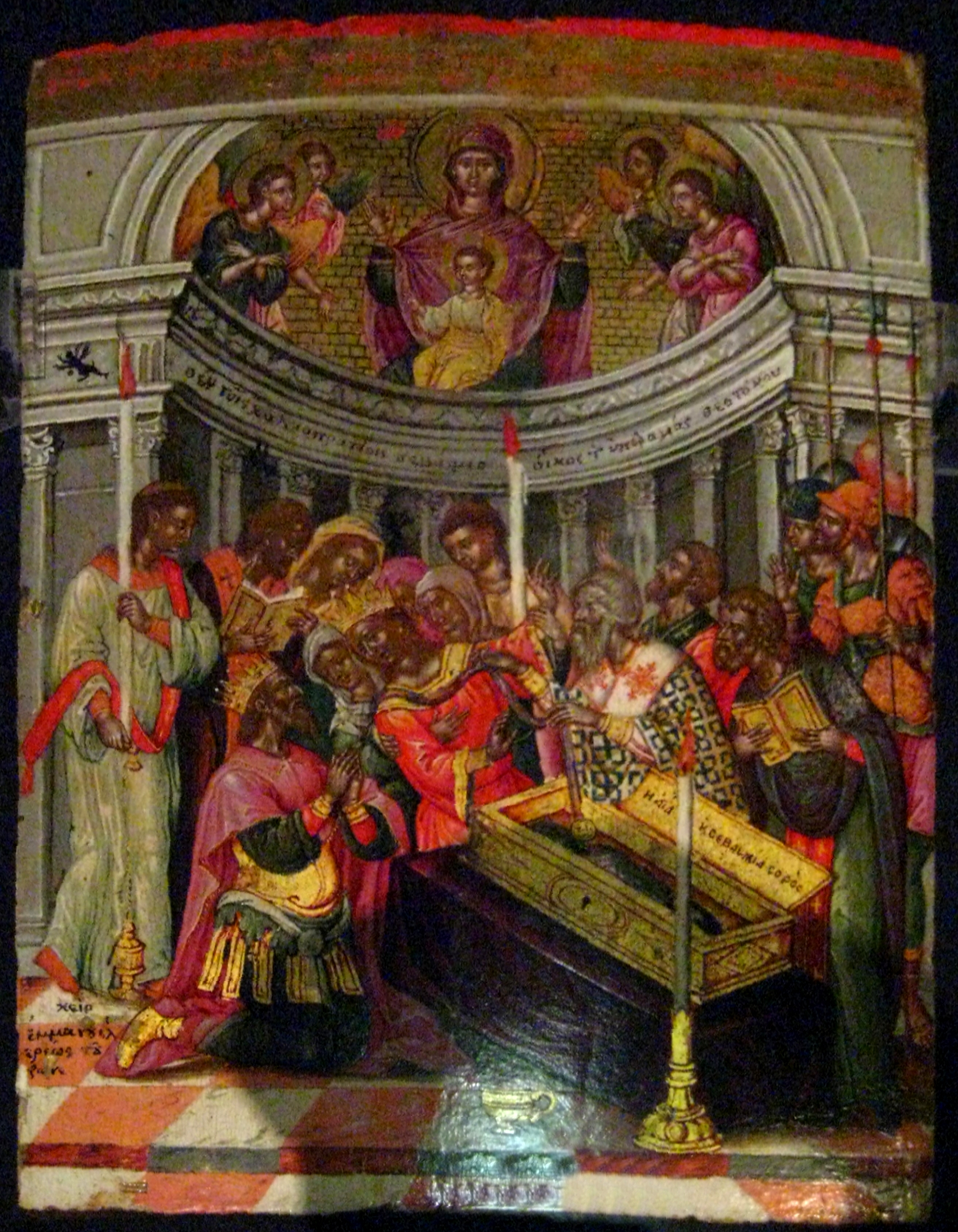
Miracle of Cincture

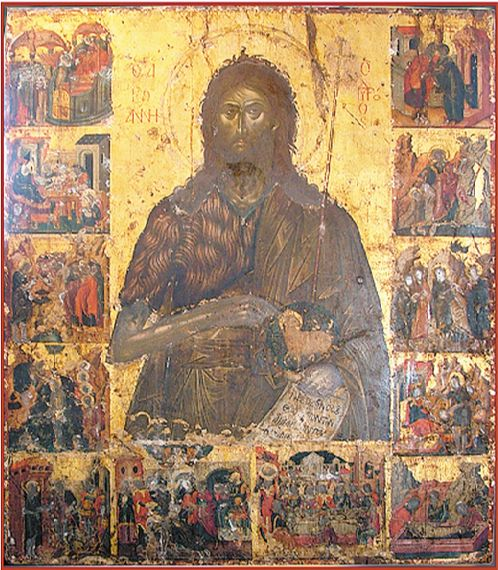
John the Baptist

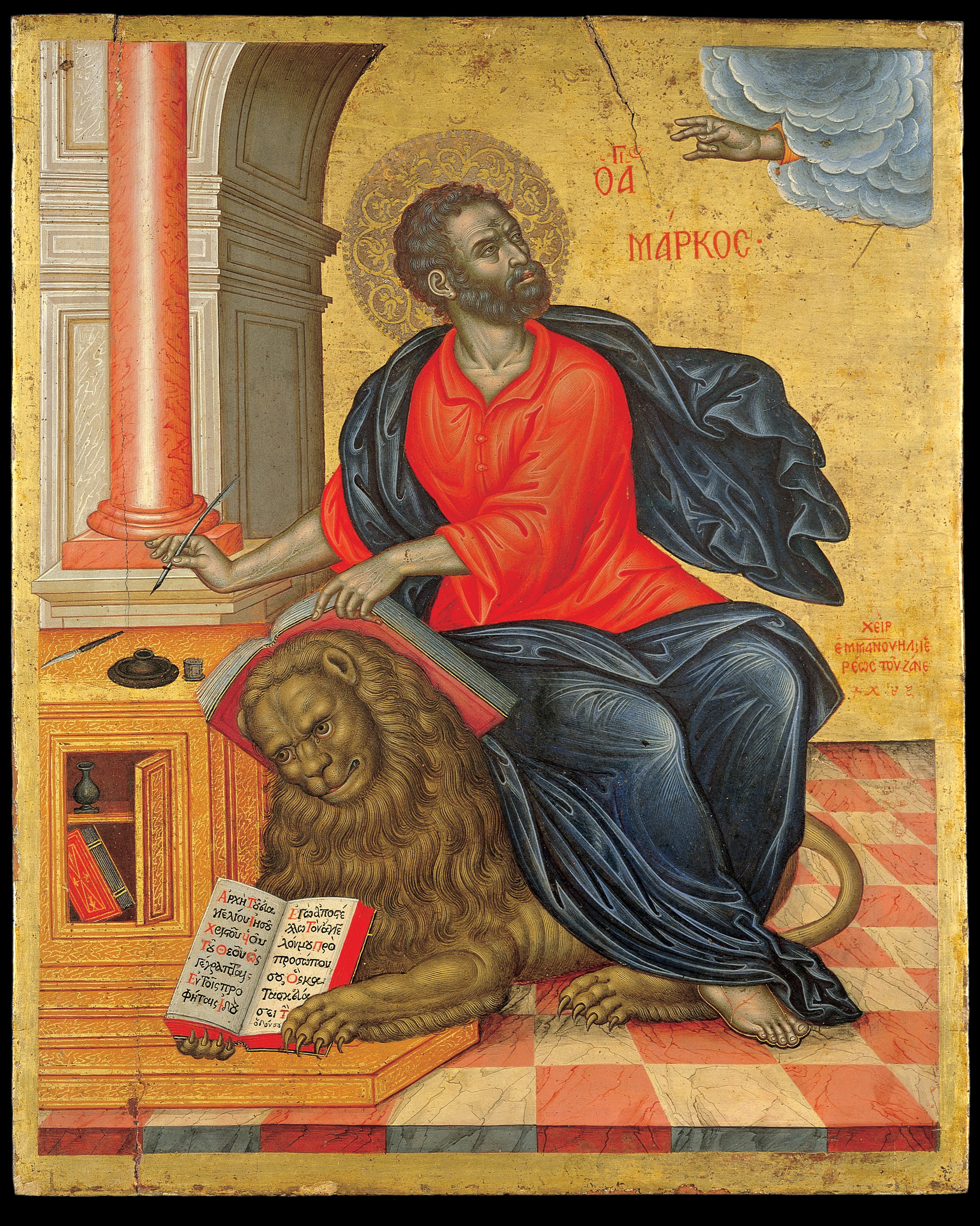
St. Mark the Evangelist

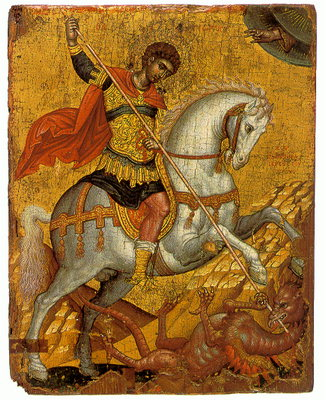
St. George killing the dragon

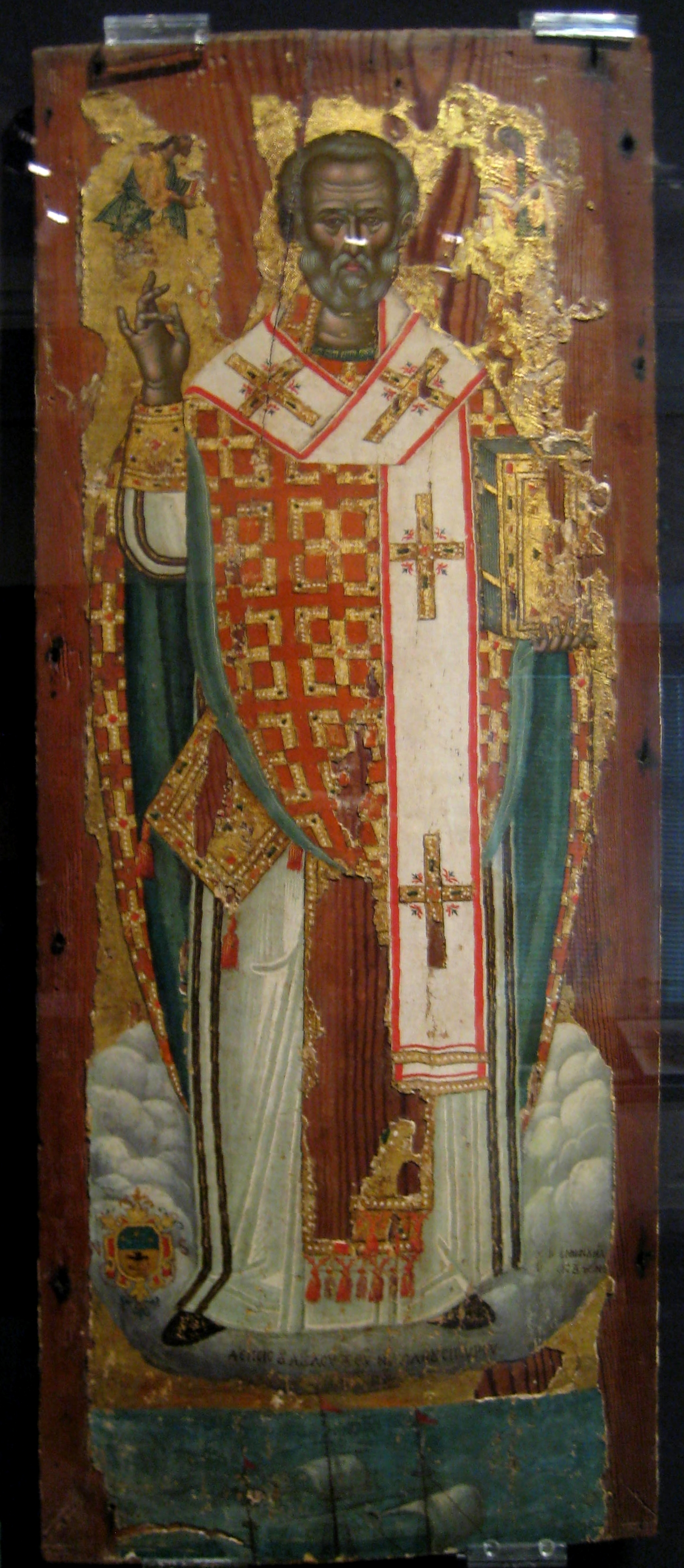
Saint Nicholas of Myra

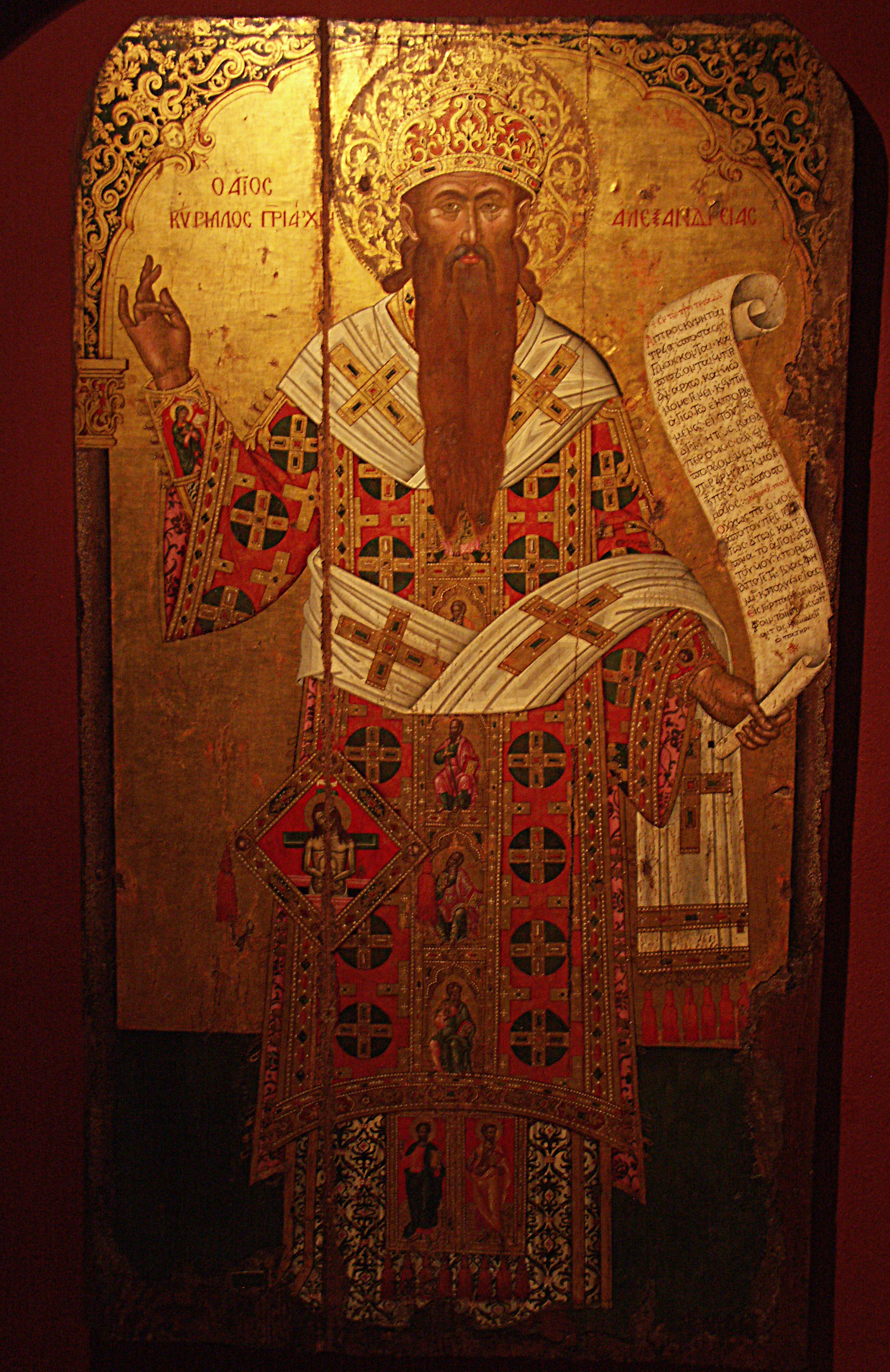
Saint Cyril of Alexandria

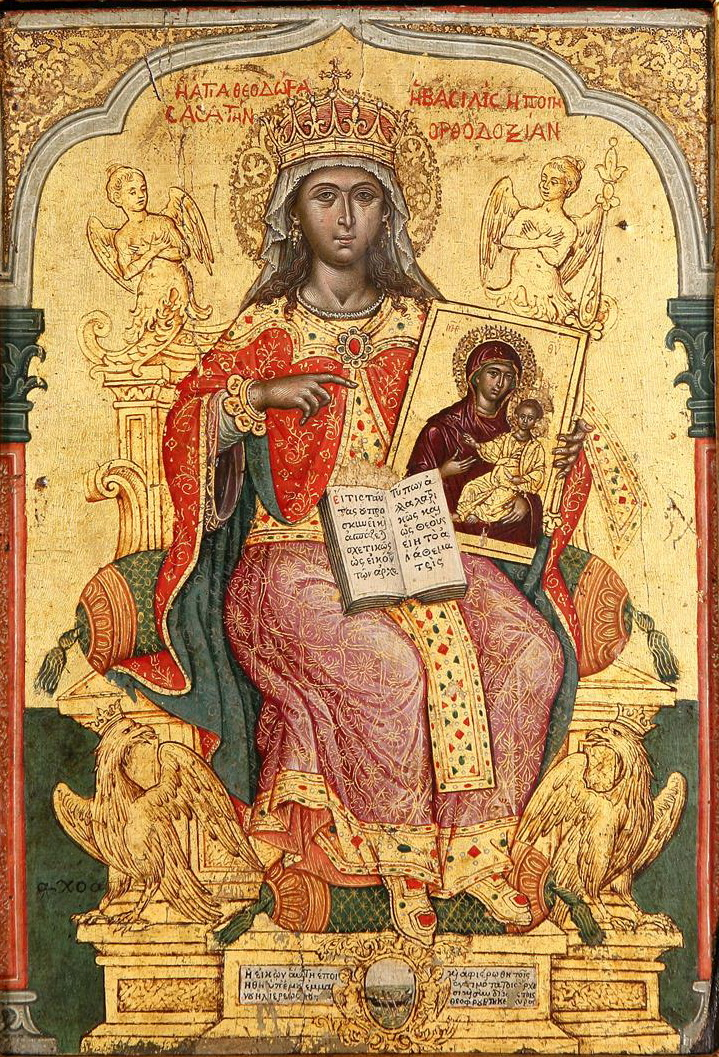
Saint Theodora

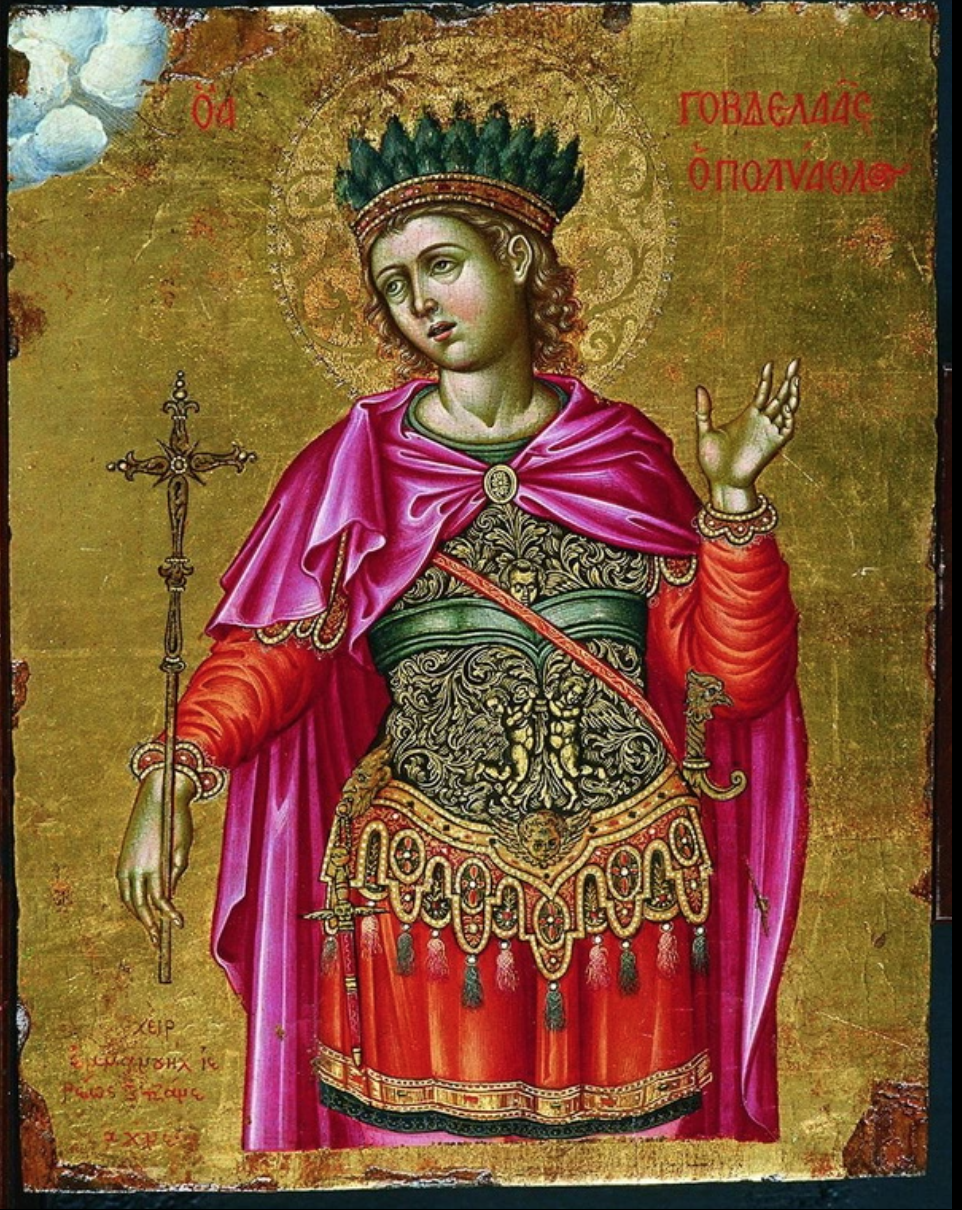
Saint Gobdelas the Persian

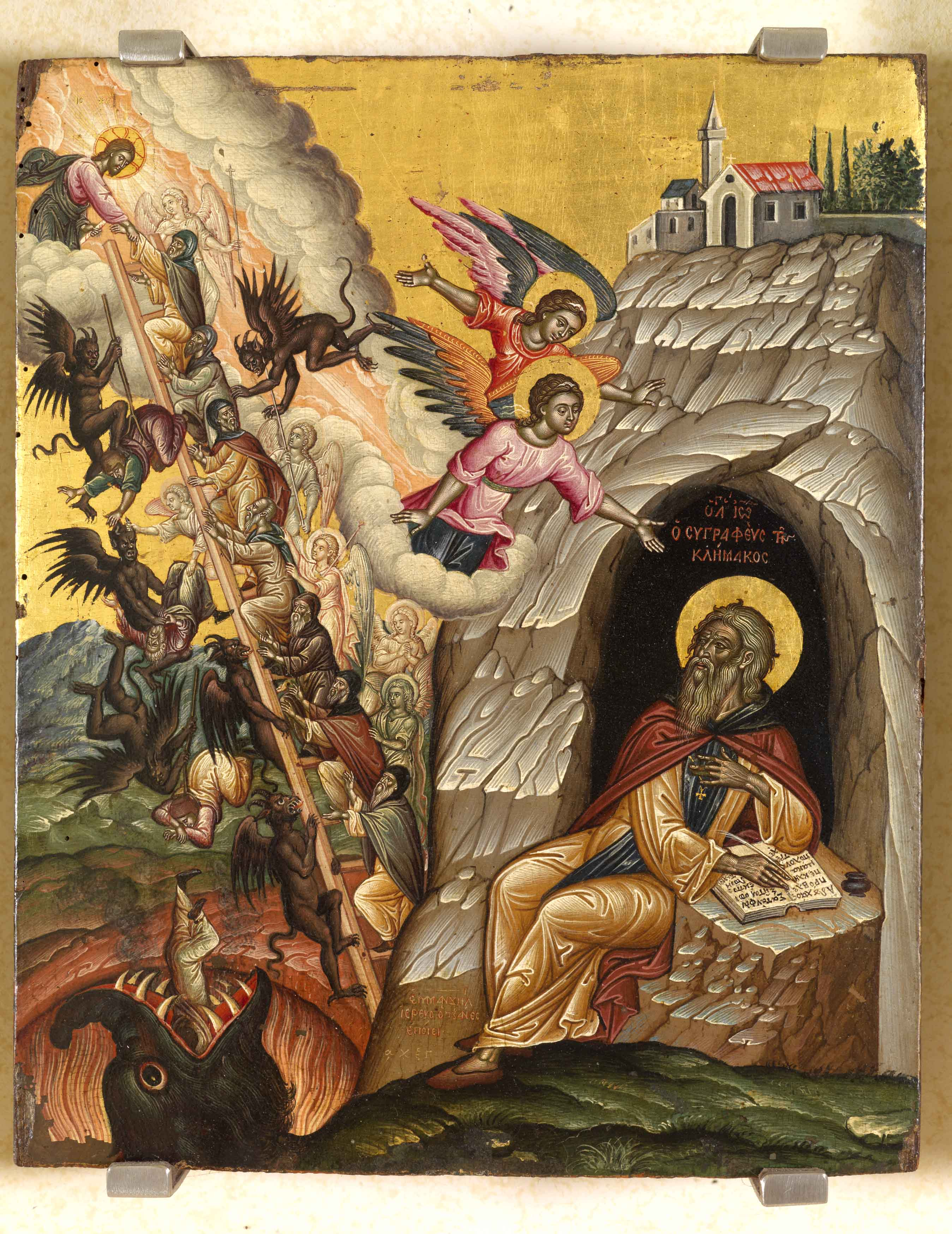
Ladder of Divine Ascent

== Timeline of artistic works ==
=== Crete ===
- 1636 Saint Spyridon (Correr Museum, Venice)
- 1640 Evangelism (Berlin State Museums)
- 1641 Theotokos Amolintos (Madonna and Child) (Museum of Zakynthos)
- 1644 The Tree of Jesse (Hellenic Institute of Venice)
- 1645 Theotokos Odigitria (Madonna and Child) (Holy Trinity Giudecca, Venice)
- 1645 Agios Antonios (Panagia ton Xenon, Corfu)
- 1646 Timios Prodromos (John the Baptist) (Church of Timios Prodromos, Kranidi)

=== Corfu ===
- 1648 Christ in Glory (Metropolitan Palace, Corfu)
- 1648 Saint Cyril (Byzantine and Christian Museum, Athens)
- 1649 Agios Iason (Church of Saints Jason and Sosipatros, Corfu)
- 1650 Agios Sosipater (Church of Saints Jason and Sosipatros, Corfu)
- 1650 Theotokos Enthroned (Church of Saints Jason and Sosipatros, Corfu)
- 1651 Theotokos (Virgin) Madre della Consolazione (Monastery of Platytera, Corfu)
- 1654 Saint Cyril of Alexandria (Museum of Antivouniotissa)
- 1654 Agios (Saint) Ioannis o Damaskinos (Church of Saints Jason and Sosipatros, Corfu)
- 1654 Saint Gregory of Palamas (Church of Saints Jason and Sosipatros, Corfu)
- 1655 Agios (Saint) Gavdelaas (Private Collection, Venice)

=== Venice ===
- 1656 Agios (Saint) Dimitrios (Loverdos Collection)
- 1657 Noli me tangere (Antivouniotissa, Corfu)
- 1657 The Virgin Mary Madre della Consolazionne
- 1657 Saint Mark
- 1662 Saint Onuphrius
- 1663 Ladder of Divine Ascent
- 1664 Christ Enthroned
- 1671 Saint Theodora
- 1684 Lady the Lambovitissa

== Literary works ==
- Satisfaction is beneficial for every Christian (In Greek)
- Sequence of the holy great martyr Fotini of Samaritan, or Christ spoke in the well (In Greek)
- Narration with lyrics of the terrible war that took place on the island of Crete (In Greek)

== See also ==
- Greek scholars in the Renaissance
- Georgios Klontzas
- Theodore Poulakis
- Manolis Hatzidakis
- Venediktos Emporios

== Bibliography ==
- Tselenti-Papadopoulou, Niki G. (2002). Οι Εικονες της Ελληνικης Αδελφοτητας της Βενετιας απο το 16ο εως το Πρωτο Μισο του 20ου Αιωνα: Αρχειακη Τεκμηριωση [The Icons of the Greek Brotherhood of Venice from 1600 to First Half of the 20th Century]. Athens: Ministry of Culture Publication of the Archaeological Bulletin No. 81. ISBN 960-214-221-9.
- Hatzidakis, Manolis; Drakopoulou, Evgenia (1997). Έλληνες Ζωγράφοι μετά την Άλωση (1450-1830). Τόμος 2: Καβαλλάρος - Ψαθόπουλος [Greek Painters after the Fall of Constantinople (1450-1830). Volume 2: Kavallaros - Psathopoulos]. Athens: Center for Modern Greek Studies, National Research Foundation. hdl:10442/14088. ISBN 960-7916-00-X.
