= Saint Theodora (Tzanes) =

Painting by Emmanuel Tzanes

- Η Αγία Θεοδώρα (Greek), Santa Teodora (Italian)
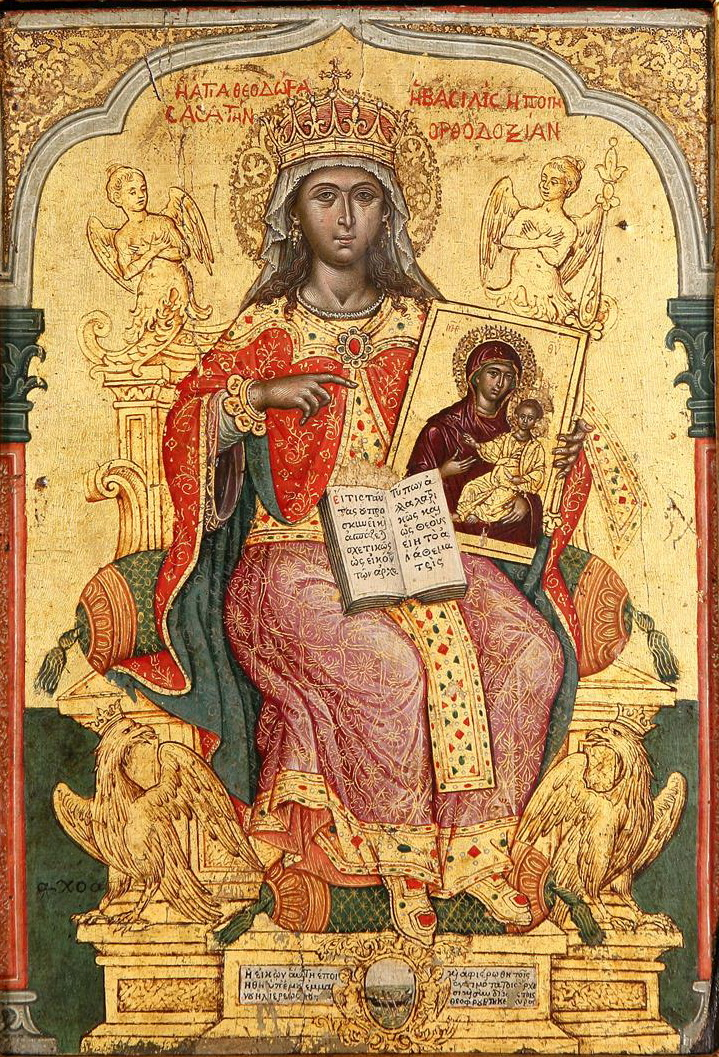
- Artist: Emmanuel Tzanes
- Year: c. 1671
- Medium: tempera on wood
- Movement: Late Cretan School
- Subject: Saint Theodora
- Dimensions: 40.5 cm × 29 cm (15.9 in × 11.4 in)
- Location: Byzantine and Christian Museum, Athens, Greece
- Owner: Byzantine and Christian Museum
- Website: Official Website

Saint Theodora is a tempera painting by Emmanuel Tzanes. Emmanuel Tzanes was a priest and painter. He was from Crete. He migrated to Venice with his two brothers, painter Konstantinos Tzanes and poet Marinos Tzanes. Emmanuel was a priest at San Giorgio dei Greci. The painters remaining works number over 130. He painted in the Greek mannerisms prevalent at the time. Empress Theodora is one of the most important figures in Greek-Italian Byzantine art history. She ended the second scourge of iconoclasm. The word literally means image breaking. Countless priceless icons and paintings were destroyed. The empress was a savior to artists. The painting is at the Byzantine Museum in Athens, Greece.

== Description ==
The painting is egg tempera on gold leaf. The dimensions are 40.5 cm (15.9 in) × 29 cm (11.4 in). The Empress is seated on a throne. The image over emits the gold character prevalent in this style of painting. Italian painters compensated for the removal of gold by adding realism to their paintings. Renaissance oil painters no longer venerated religious figures with gold. The top left and right sides of the painting feature an elaborate decorative rococo motif. The sides are both decorated with ancient Greek corinthian columns. The Empress is covered in precious stones from head to toe.

The green, red and pink garment features clear striations and folds of fabric. The face of the royal is painted in adequate detail, flesh tones are clearly visible. She points to a painting of the Virgin and Child. The painting is the traditional hodegetria. Jesus is dressed in gold emphasizing the veneration of the deities with the precious metal. The painter clearly exhibits the empress as the savior of the arts. Two eagles are present one faces the east, and the other the west. The open book has a Greek inscription venerating the champion of the arts. It states: In this icon you are venerated, as an icon of the ancients, but also as a saint against iconoclasm. Two angels sit behind her thrown to her left and right.

== See also ==
Byzantine Iconoclasm
