= Venture =

Venture may refer to:

== Arts and entertainment ==
=== Music ===
- The Ventures, an American instrumental rock band
- "A Venture", a song by Yes from The Yes Album

=== Games ===
- Venture (video game), a 1981 arcade game
- Venture, a strategic card game by Sid Sackson
- Venture (Overwatch), a playable character from the video game Overwatch 2

=== Film and television ===
- SS Venture, a ship in King Kong and its 2005 remake
- SS Venture, an InGen-owned ship featured in The Lost World: Jurassic Park
- Venture (TV series), a Canadian business television show

== Magazines ==
- Venture Science Fiction, defunct US science fiction magazine
- Venture (magazine), a management magazine

== Business ==
- Business venture
- Cooks Venture, defunct poultry company
- Venture (department store), a defunct discount department store operating across Australia
- Venture Stores, a former retail chain

== Transportation ==
- Chevrolet Venture, a General Motors minivan
- Yamaha Venture, Yamaha touring motorcycles
- Siemens Venture, family of railroad passenger cars
- Venture, a series of sailing yachts produced by MacGregor Yacht Corporation

== Other uses ==
- Venture Scout, a section of the Scout Movement, mostly in countries of the Commonwealth of Nations
- Canadian Naval Officer Training Centre Venture, in CFB Esquimalt, British Columbia
- USS Venture, several U.S. naval ships
- HMS Venturer, several British naval ships
