= Spyridon Ventouras =

Greek painter

- Born: 1761; Lefkada, Greece
- Died: 1835 (aged 73–74); Lefkada, Greece
- Known for: Iconography and Portrait Painting
- Notable work: Portrait of Ali Pasha
- Movement: Heptanese School; Greek Neoclassicism; Greek Romanticism

Spyridon Ventouras (Greek: Σπυρίδων Βεντούρας, 1761–1835) also known as Spyridon Venturas. He was a Greek painter, professor and architect. He was a prominent member of the Heptanese School. He represented the art of Lefkada. Many Greek painters were associated with the island namely: Konstantinos Kontarinis, Stylianos Devaris, Spyridon Maratzos, and Makarios Lefkas. Other active painters of the Heptanese School during the same period were Nikolaos Koutouzis and Nikolaos Kantounis. The Greek community was undergoing the Neo-Hellenikos Diafotismos in art. Ventouras influenced countless artists both Greek and Italian. The painting of John Chrysostom, Criticizing Empress Eudoxia was copied by many painters from the region. Some of the artists were Makarios Lefkas and Stylianos Devaris. Ventouras also painted his own version. According to the Institute of Neohellenic Research, over sixty of his paintings have survived, five of them were notable portraits. His most notable work was a Portrait of Ali Paschi.

== History ==
Ventouras was born on the island of Lefkada. His family migrated from Corfu. His father's name was Antonios. His mother's name was Giannoula P Mela. In 1785, he traveled to Venice and studied painting at the Accademia di Belle Arti di Venezia. He remained unmarried and had a problem with his vision throughout his life. Around 1797, he was paid 120 litres for an image of the Pentecost. In 1817, he was hired to paint the church called Entrance of the Virgin in Lefkada. His most notable work around this period was a portrait of Ali Pasha of Ioannina. He was the Ottoman Pasha. The leader's consul on the island of Lefkada Marinos Lazaris hired Ventouras to paint his portrait.

The payment of the portrait was never remunerated and the issue went to trial. Ventouras filed a lawsuit with the courts. He claimed he gave the painting to the Pasha and was never paid. The lawsuit was a very sensitive issue because it could lead to a diplomatic incident. The court asked permission from the local government on how to proceed. On 6 September 1819, the court issued a decision requiring the consul Marinos Lazaris to pay 100 thalers to the painter, Judge Judice di Pace was presiding. Ventouras was paid on 18 September 1819. The court also referred to Ventouras as a professor.

A family legend evolved from the story. The Pasha called the painter to finish a portrait for him in Ioannina. He promised he would pay him generously. When the job was completed they refused to pay the painter and planned to put him to death. The painter was warned in secret. He fled the city overnight to avoid sudden death. He decided to avenge the tyrant back in Lefkada. He bought painting supplies and from his memory repainted the Pasha and sold the paintings in the market of Preveza.

Ventouras's final works were of the Apostles and Christ on the iconostasis in the church of Agios Minas in Lefkada. The archives of Lefkada have architectural plans of Lefkada with his signature dated around 1825. He drew houses and stores. His massive art collection has survived over 200 years. He died around seventy-four years old. He was buried in a family grave in the church of Panagia ton Xenon in Lefkada.

== Gallery ==
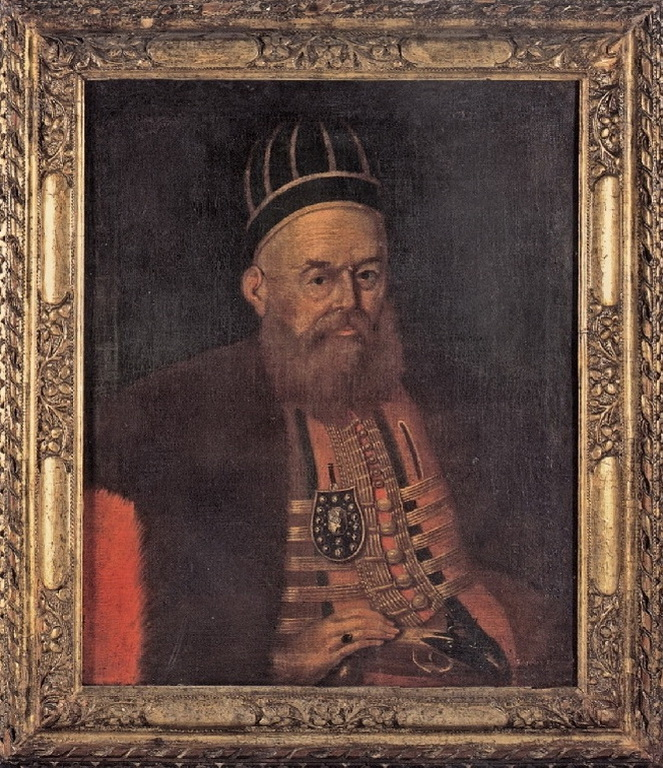
Portrait of Ali Pasha

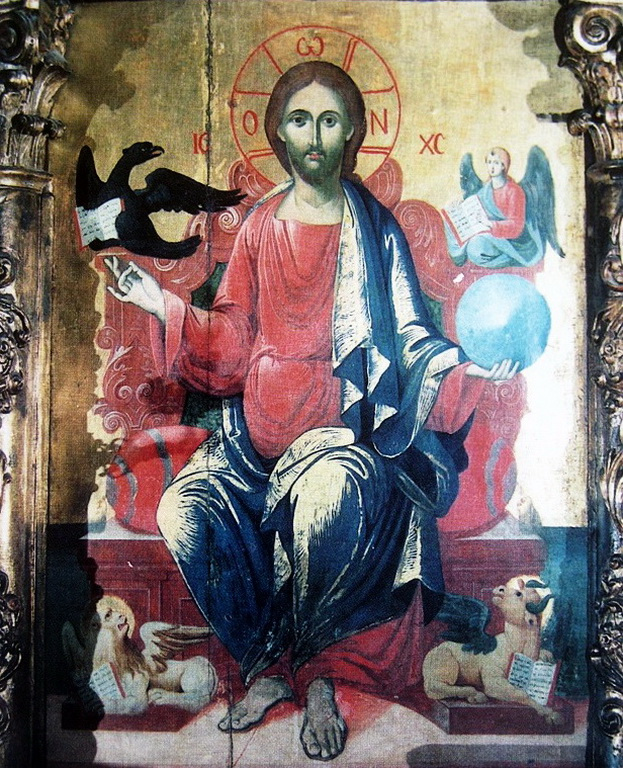
Portrait of Jesus

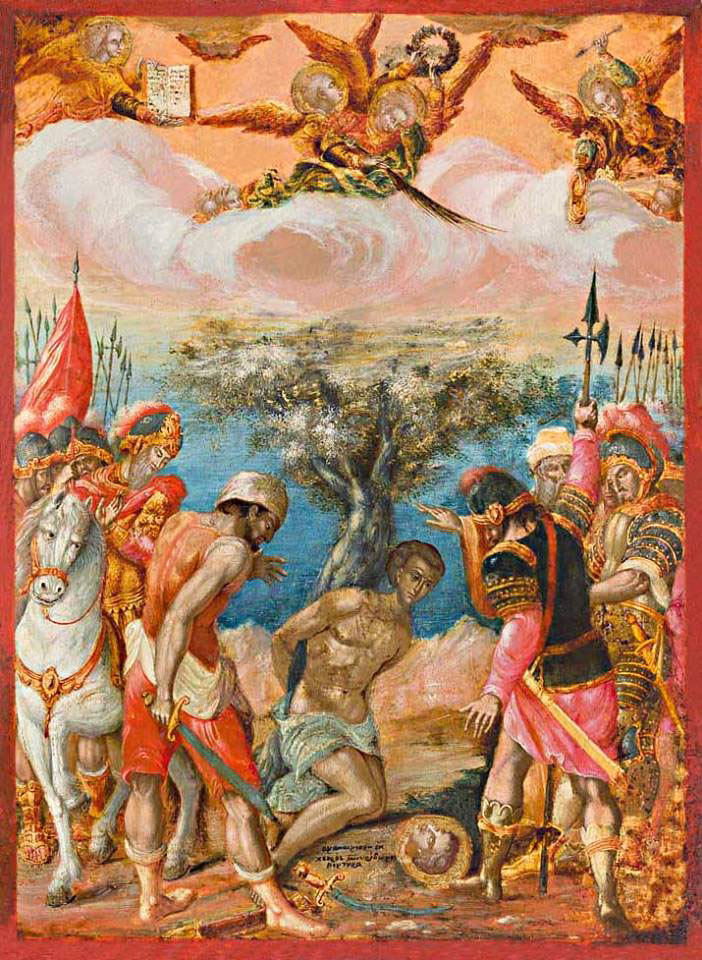
Martyrdom of Saint Panteleimon

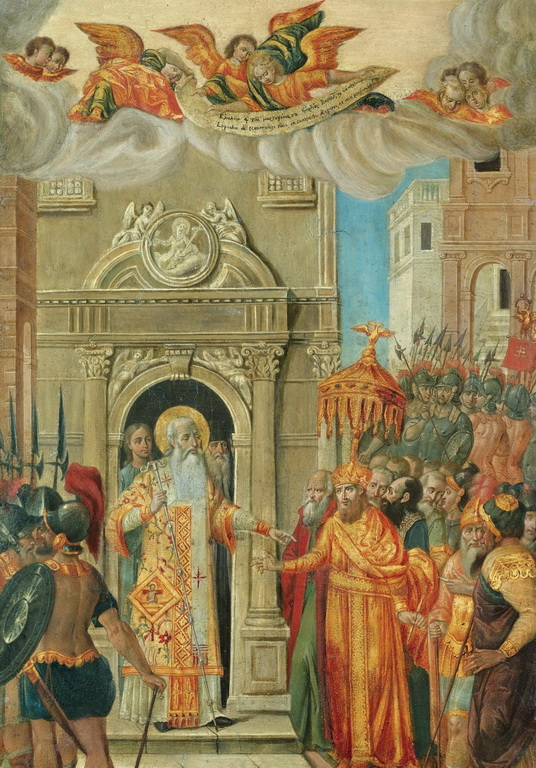
John Chrysostom Criticizes Empress Eudoxia

== Notable works ==
- Portrait of Sp. Kalkani Private Collection of Irene Kalkani Athens Greece
- Portrait of Unknown Patron Ekia Gr. Mhkou Lefkada Greece
- A Scene from the Life of John Chrysostom (Ventouras)

== Bibliography ==
- Hatzidakis, Manolis (1987). Greek painters after the fall (1450-1830) Volume A. Athens, GR: Center for Modern Greek Studies E.I.E.
- Hatzidakis, Manolis & Drakopoulou, Eugenia (1997). Greek painters after the fall (1450-1830) Volume B. Athens, GR: Center for Modern Greek Studies E.I.E.
- Drakopoulou, Eugenia (2010). Greek painters after the fall (1450-1830) Volume C. Athens, GR: Center for Modern Greek Studies E.I.E.
