= Boa Ventura de São Roque =

Coordinates: 24.8689°S 51.6278°W

- Municipality
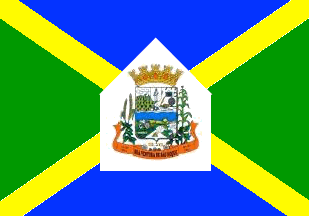
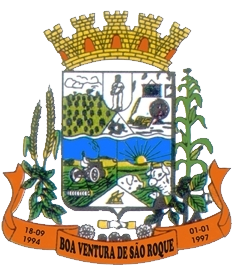
- Flag Coat of arms
- Interactive map of Boa Ventura de São Roque
- Country: Brazil
- Region: Southern
- State: Paraná
- Mesoregion: Centro-Sul Paranaense

Population (2020)
  - Total: 6,365
- Time zone: UTC−3 (BRT)

Boa Ventura de São Roque is a municipality in the state of Paraná in the Southern Region of Brazil.

== See also ==
- List of municipalities in Paraná
