= Boa Ventura, Paraíba =

Coordinates: 7°24′50″S 38°12′57″W

- Municipality
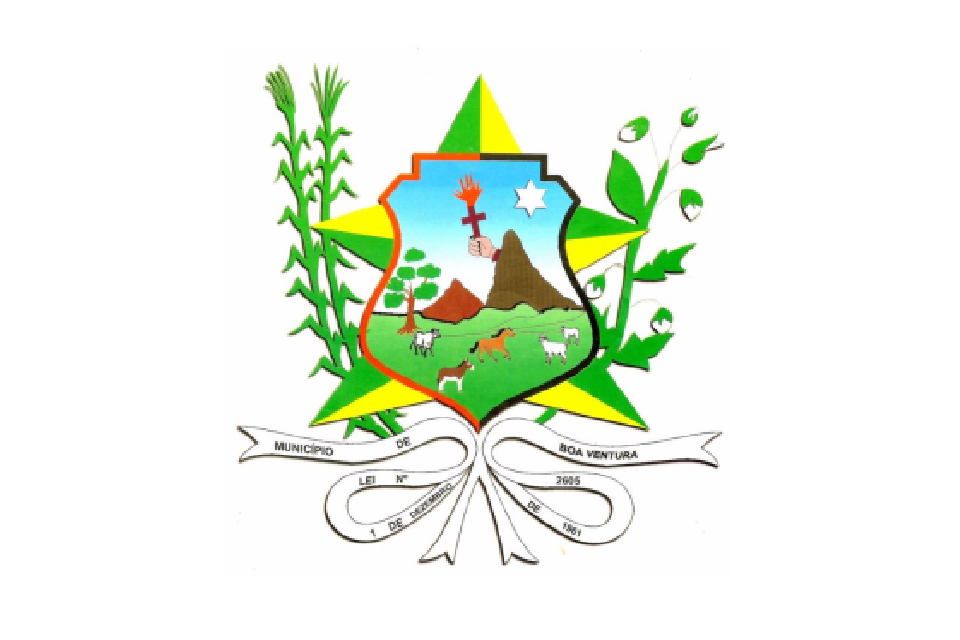
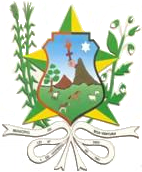
- Flag Coat of arms
- Interactive map of Boa Ventura, Paraíba
- Country: Brazil
- Region: Northeast
- State: Paraíba
- Mesoregion: Sertao Paraibana

Population (2020)
  - Total: 5,307
- Time zone: UTC−3 (BRT)

Boa Ventura, Paraíba is a municipality in the state of Paraíba in the Northeast Region of Brazil.

== See also ==
- List of municipalities in Paraíba
