= Stylianos Devaris =

Greek Painter

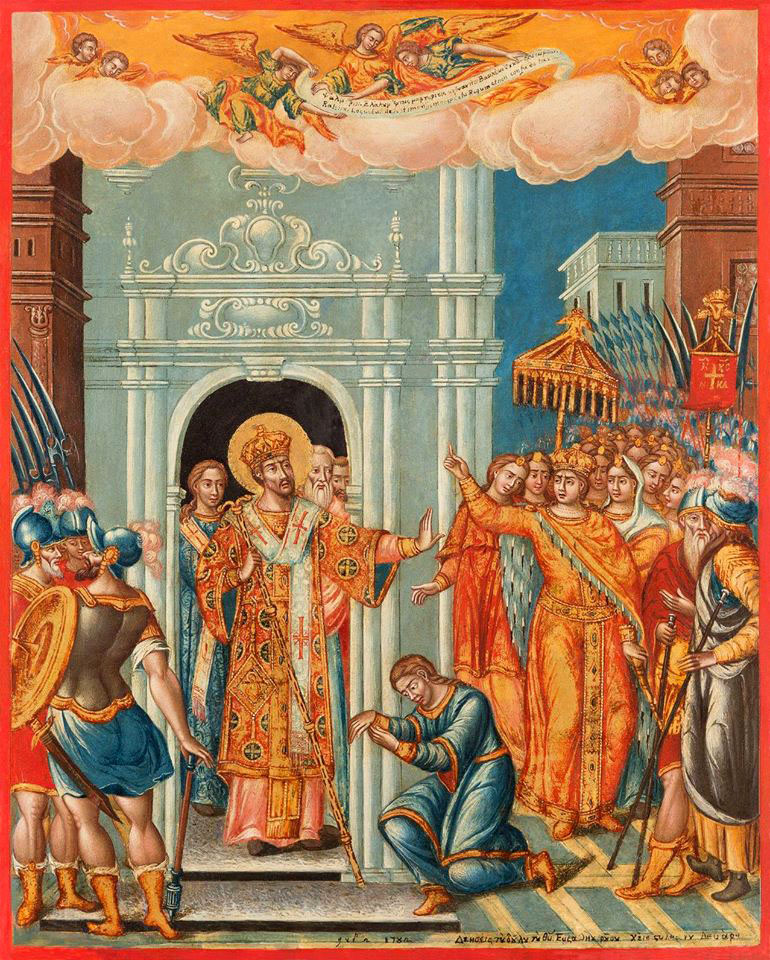
- John Chrysostom, Criticizing Empress Eudoxia
- Born: 1745; Lefkada, Greece
- Died: 1813 (aged 67–68); Lefkada, Greece
- Known for: Iconographer and Goldsmith
- Movement: Heptanese School; Greek Neoclassicism; Greek Romanticism

Stylianos Devaris (Greek: Στυλιανός Δεβάρης, 1745 – 1813), also known as Defaris (Greek: Δενάρης) and Kornaros (Greek: Κορνάρος) respectively. He was a Greek painter and goldsmith. He was one of the prominent painters from the island of Lefkada. He was a member of the Heptanese School. The island featured many painters namely: Konstantinos Kontarinis, Spyridon Ventouras, Spyridon Maratzos, and Makarios Lefkas. A notable theme popular on the island was John Chrysostom, Criticizing Empress Eudoxia. Stylianos painted his own version of the theme. Spyridon Ventouras and Makarios Lefkas also painted their versions. Devaris mainly painted ecclesiastical themes. According to the Institute of Neohellenic Research, over nineteen of his paintings have survived. His most notable work was John Chrysostom, Criticizing Empress Eudoxia.

== History ==
Devaris was born on the island of Lefkada. His father's name was Tzortzis. The family was associated with the island of Kephalonia. His brother was born there. His name was Ioannis. He was also a painter. He was five years older than Stylianos. They collaborated on several projects together in Lefkada. The church archives in Lefkada contain a rich amount of information about the painter. Stylianos also used the name Kornaros because his name was so popular on the island of Lefkada. Stylianos created small works and gilded the iconostasis of several churches.

In 1778, the artist worked on the church of Agia Paraskevi. Two years later he worked on the church of Agioi Anargyroi of Lefkada. He also painted an icon for the church of Saint Mavra in 1783. Saint Mavra was the patron saint of Lefkada. He also painted icons for the church of the Holy Apostles (Agioi Apostoli) in Frini, Lefkada in 1793, 1794, and 1797. In his final years, he worked on the iconostasis of the church Entrance of the Virgin in the city of Lefkada in 1813. He died on the island that same year.

== Gallery ==
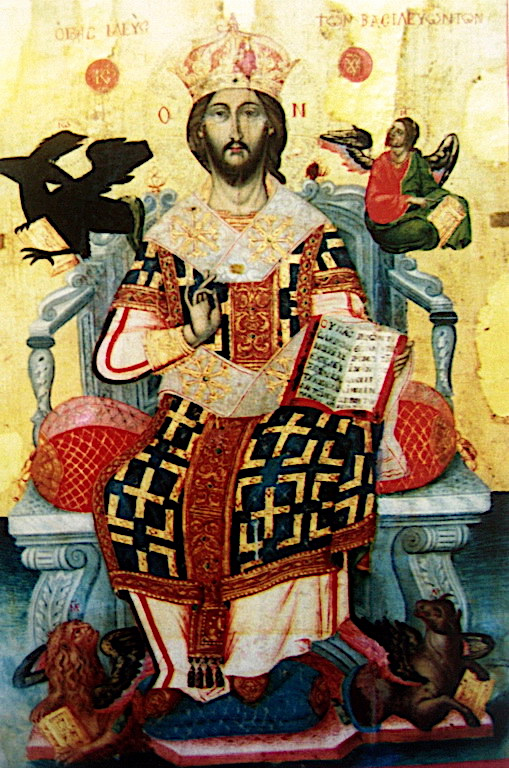
Christ Enthroned

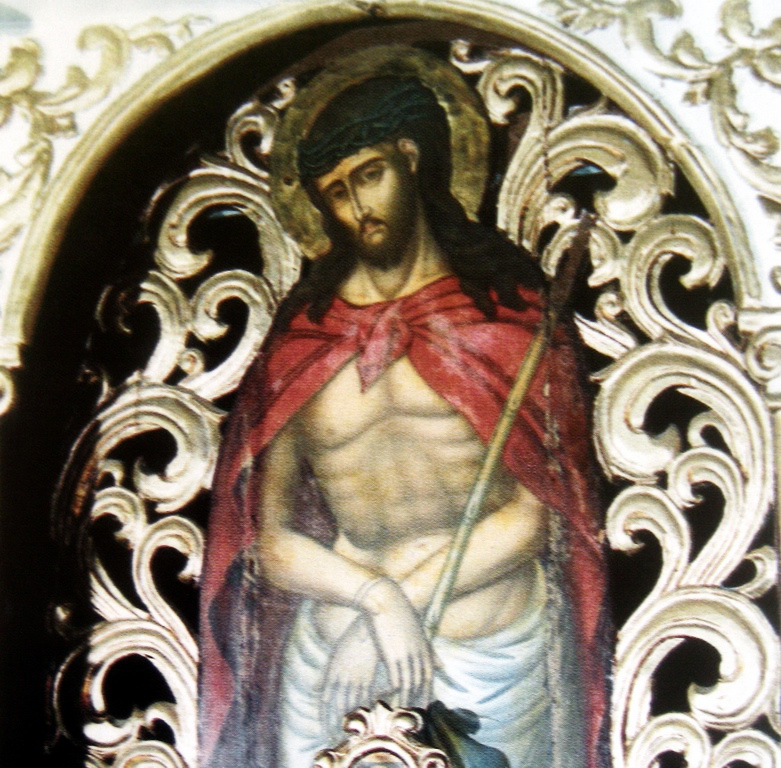
Behold The Man

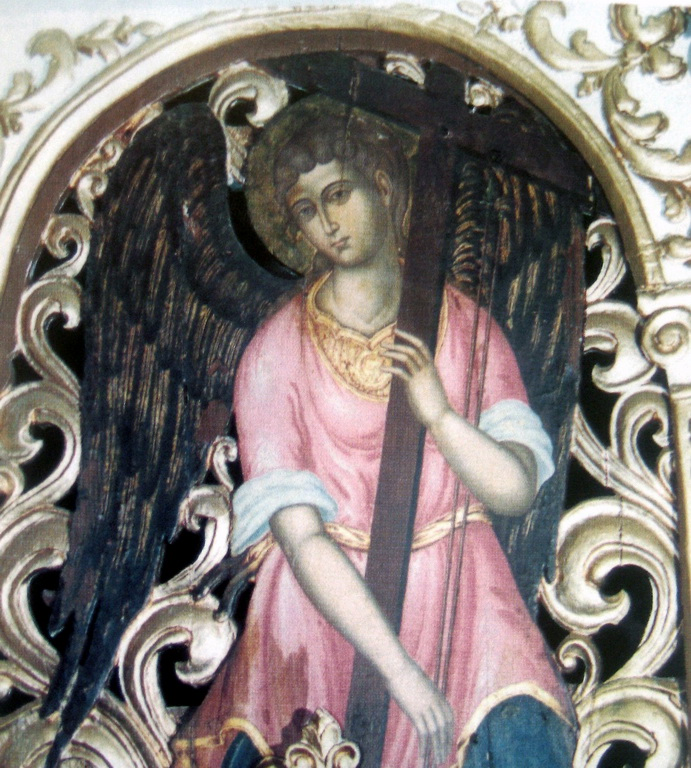
Archangel Gabriel

== See also ==
- Efstathios Karousos
- Jean-Paul Laurens

== Bibliography ==
- Hatzidakis, Manolis (1987). Greek painters after the fall (1450-1830) Volume A. Athens, GR: Center for Modern Greek Studies E.I.E.
- Hatzidakis, Manolis & Drakopoulou, Eugenia (1997). Greek painters after the fall (1450-1830) Volume B. Athens, GR: Center for Modern Greek Studies E.I.E.
- Drakopoulou, Eugenia (2010). Greek painters after the fall (1450-1830) Volume C. Athens, GR: Center for Modern Greek Studies E.I.E.
