= The Fall of Man (Poulakis) =

Painting by Theodore Poulakis

- Πτώση του Aνθρώπου (Greek), Caduta Dell'uomo (Italian)
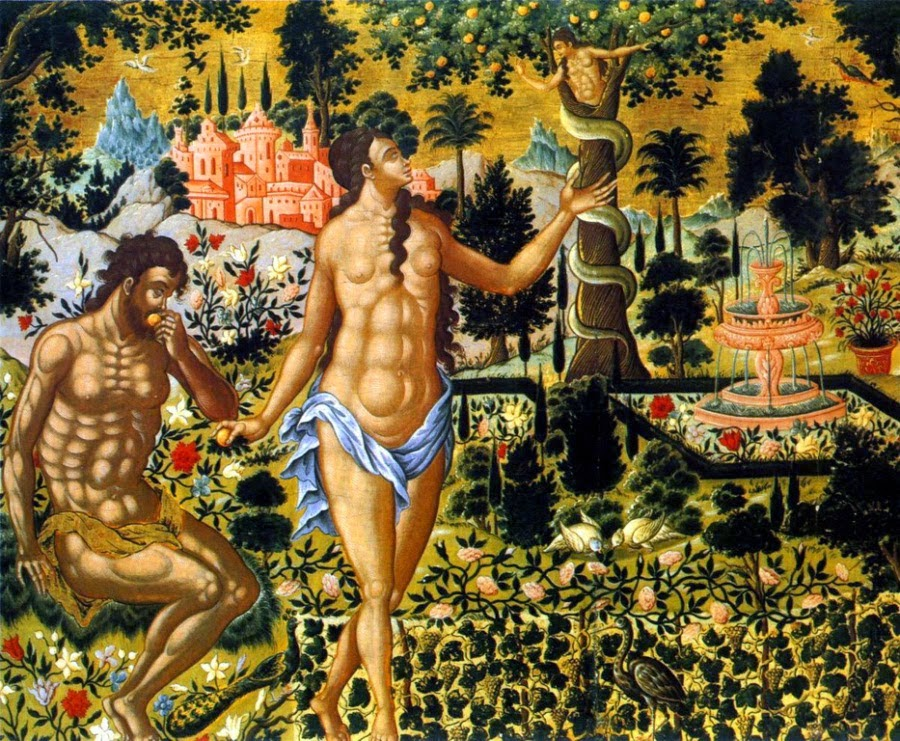
- Artist: Theodore Poulakis
- Year: c. 1640–1692
- Medium: tempera on wood
- Movement: Heptanese School
- Subject: The Fall of Man
- Dimensions: 62.5 cm × 79 cm (24.6 in × 31.1 in)
- Location: Collection of Dimitris Kontominas, Athens, Greece
- Owner: Collection of Dimitris Kontominas

The Fall of Man is a tempera painting by Theodore Poulakis. Poulakis was a Greek Baroque artist. He was a painter and teacher. He flourished during the Late Cretan School and the Heptanese School. He is often regarded as the father of the Heptanese School. His painting career was from 1635 to 1692. He was living in Venice at the age of 24. He mastered painting while he lived in the city. He was involved in the quarantia. He traveled all over the Ionian Islands and eventually settled on the island of Corfu. He also frequently returned to Venice. Over 130 of his paintings have survived. They can be found in Greece and Italy.

Adam and Eve have been depicted in Greek Italian art since the dawn of the new Christian religion. Countless painters adopted the subject matter. In the 16th century, a French goldsmith and engraver named Étienne Delaune created a series of old testament engravings. His work circulated Europe and in the 17th-century Venetian engraver and printer Stefano Scolari (1640 - 1691) replicated his work. The prints circulated throughout the Venetian world. Poulaki integrated Delaune's work in his paintings. One specific example was Poulaki's In Thee Rejoiceth . The artist used some of Delaune's engravings as inspiration for the masterpiece specifically in the upper portion. The Fall of Man is not an identical replica of an engraving by Delaune but it was inspired by his work. The work later inspired a similar painting by Greek painter Konstantinos Kontarinis. The Fall of Man is part of the Collection of Dimitris Kontominas in Athens, Greece. The painting was formerly part of the collection of Count Cesare Cicogna Mozzoni and Countess Annamaria Volpi di Misurata in Venice.

== Description ==
The materials used for the painting were tempera paint on a wood panel. The height is 62.5 cm (24.6 in) and the width is 79 cm (31.1 in). The engraving by Delaune was partially replicated. Adam and Eve, the serpent, and the tree were imported by Poulakis from the sketch-like printed engraving. The artist creatively animated the wood panel with a lavish landscape filled with birds and shrubbery. In the background, a peach castle appears inlaid with brilliant variations of the color. The color shading on the figures humanizes both Adam and Eve as they stand in the foreground. The artist clearly illustrates a complex three-dimensional image. Eve looks up at the half man half snake as it waves at her while Adam bites the apple. Eve gazes at the serpent with a hypnotized sense of desire. The tree and serpent occupy the middle ground. Both Adam and Eve feature sculpted anatomies. Their bodies are well-toned. The artist adds roses and a water fountain to his landscape. Poulakis and his contemporaries viewed pictorial expression based on observation. The Fall of Man resonates the idea that the visual world must be observed before it could be analyzed and understood.

== Gallery ==
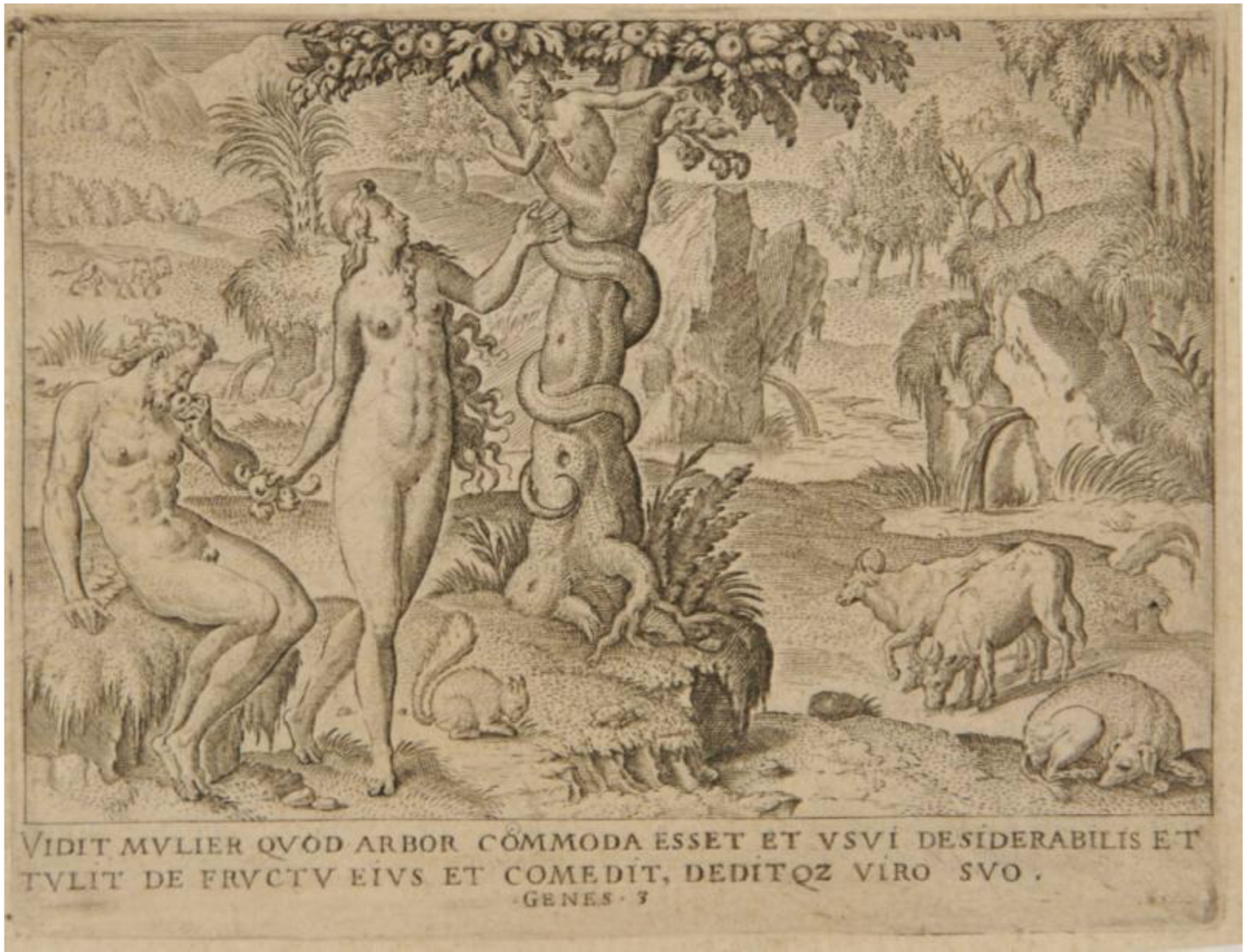
Fall of Man Étienne Delaune

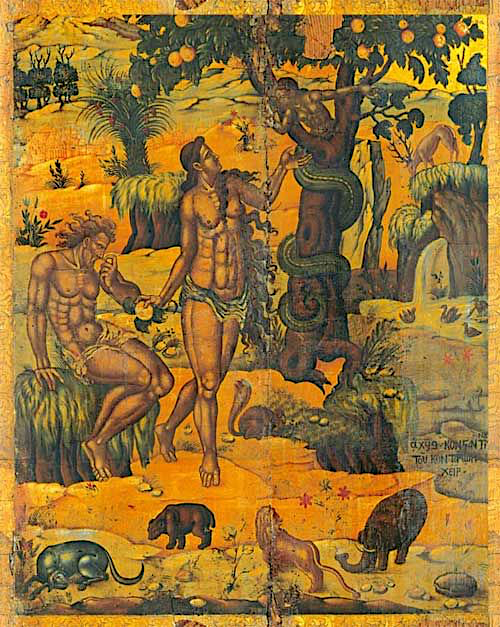
Fall of Man Konstantinos Kontarinis

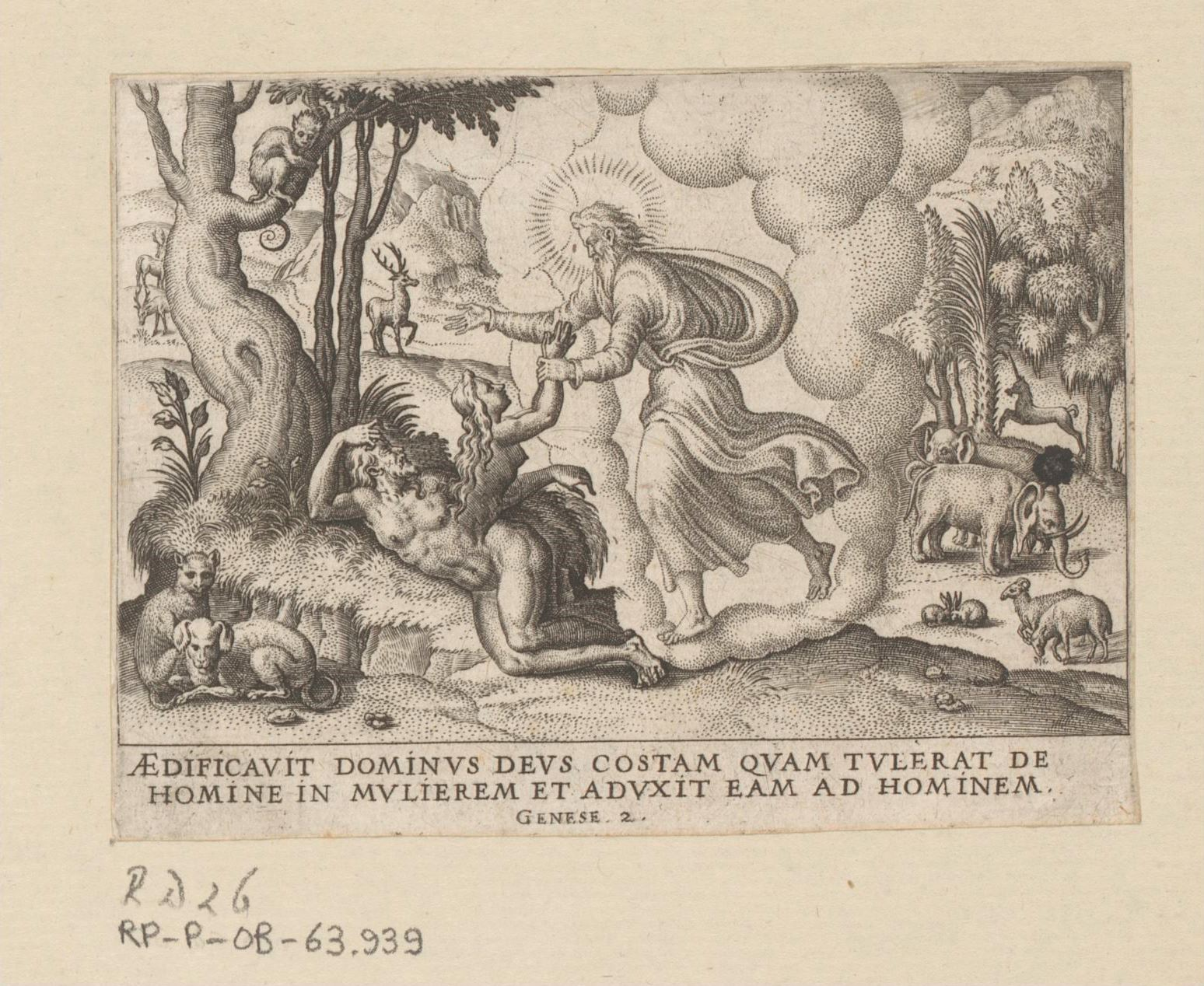
God Creating Eve Étienne Delaune

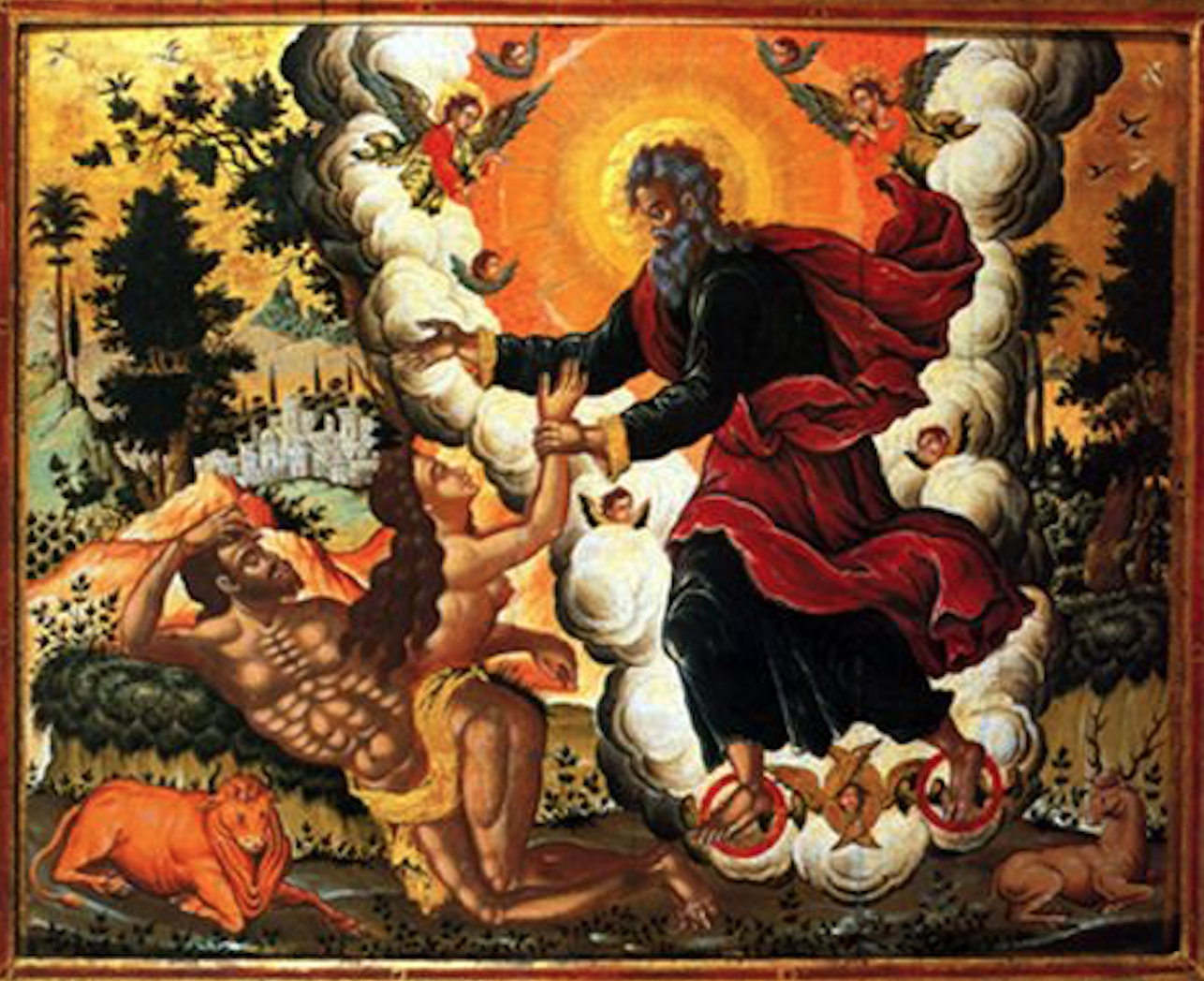
God Creating Eve
