= Dionysios Tsokos =

Greek painter (c. 1814/1820 – 1862)

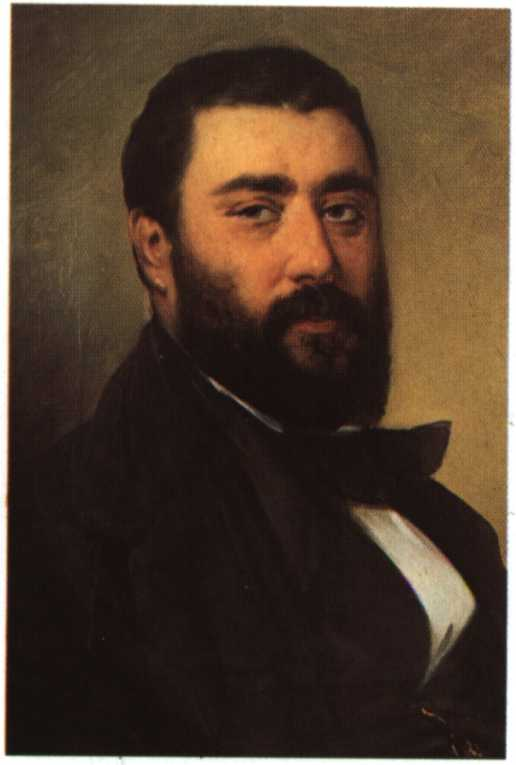
Self-portrait (date unknown)

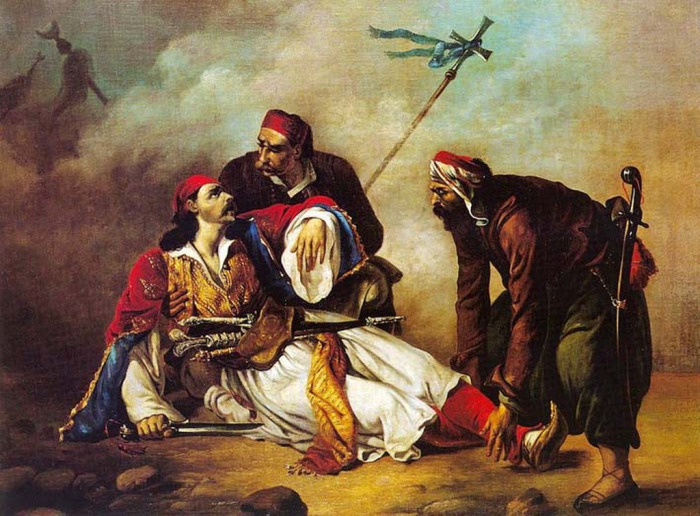
The Death of Markos Botsaris

Dionysios Tsokos (Greek: Διονύσιος Τσόκος; c. 1814/1820 in Zakynthos – 1862 in Athens) was a Greek painter; one of the first to gain recognition in the post-Ottoman period. He is mostly known for portraits and historical scenes which combine elements from the Heptanese School with Italian styles.

== Biography ==
His parents came from Epirus. He took his first painting lessons from Nikolaos Kantounis, who was living in exile on a small island near Cephalonia. Kantounis not only taught him to paint, but infused him with nationalistic feelings as well.

His activities over the next few years are unclear, but by 1844, he was in Venice, attending classes taught by Ludovico Lipparini, who first suggested that Tsokos concentrate on portraits and history painting. In 1845, he had his first public exhibition at the Accademia di Belle Arti di Venezia.

He returned to Greece in 1847, settling in Athens, where he created a series of popular paintings related to the War of Independence and the years immediately after. From 1850 to 1860, he was commissioned to paint portraits of many prominent personalities, including professors at the University of Athens.

In 1856, he was appointed professor of design and painting at the "Arsakeio", a school operated by the "Society for Education". That same year, he held a major exhibition of his portraits at the Athens School of Fine Arts.

He died under mysterious circumstances in 1862, the year that King Otto was overthrown. At the time, he was working on a commission to produce portraits of heroes from the War of Independence. The finished portraits are in the National Gallery. The unfinished sketches are in the collection of the Benaki Museum.
