= Nikolaos Xydias Typaldos =

Greek painter

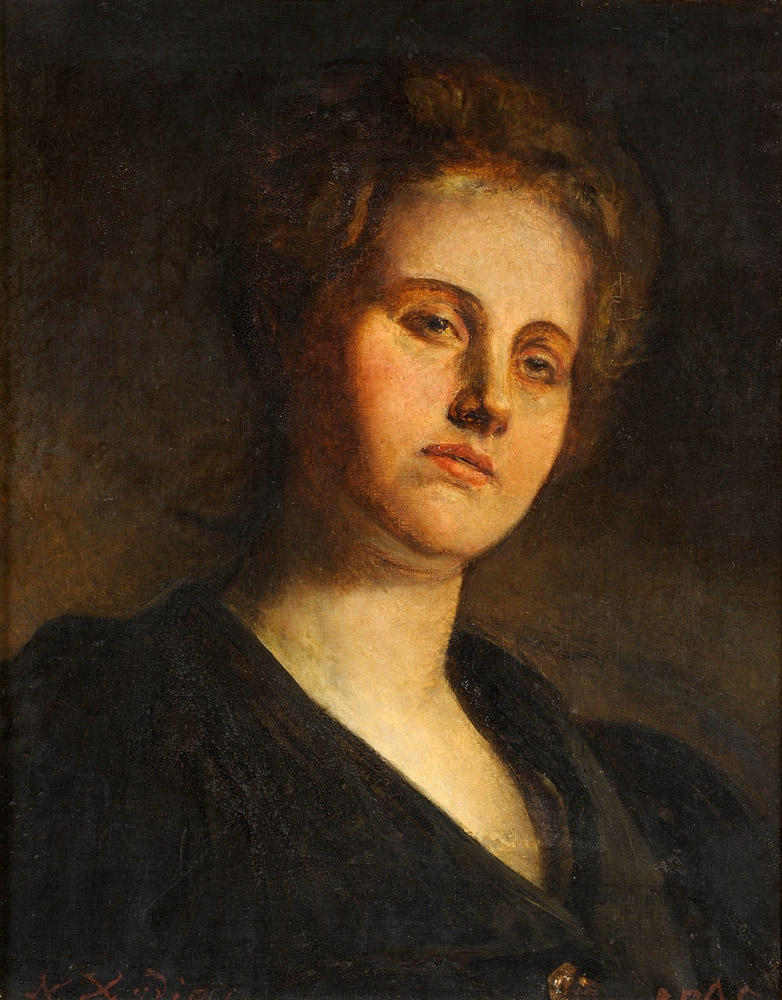
Portrait of a Greek Woman (date unknown)

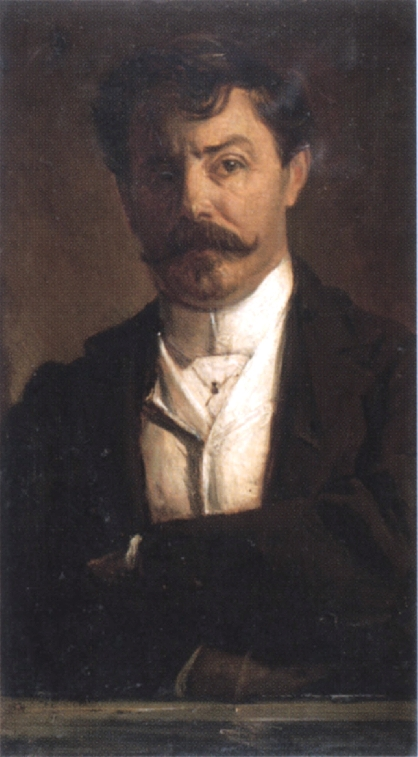
Portrait of Arthur Nikisch

Nikolaos Xydias Typaldos (Greek: Νικόλαος Ξυδιάς Τυπάλδος; 1826/29, Lixouri – 1909, Athens) was a Greek painter, best known for his portraits. He worked mostly in the Academic style.

== Biography ==
His first studies were in Italy, followed by some time at the École des Beaux-Arts in Paris, where he held several exhibitions to good critical response. Although initially influenced by the Heptanese School of painting, his time in France opened him up to modern trends. The work of Manet was a major influence.

He continued to live in Paris for many years, but spent much of his career travelling, spending time in London, Italy and Saint Petersburg. In 1890, he returned to Greece and won a gold medal at an exhibition in Parnassos.

In addition to his portraits, he also created still-lifes and genre paintings, as well as scenes from history and mythology, which are considered to be Pre-Impressionist.
