= Jacob's Ladder (Moskos) =

Painting by Elias Moskos

Jacob’s Ladder
- Η Κλίμακα του Ιακώβ (Greek), Scala di Giacobbe (Italian)
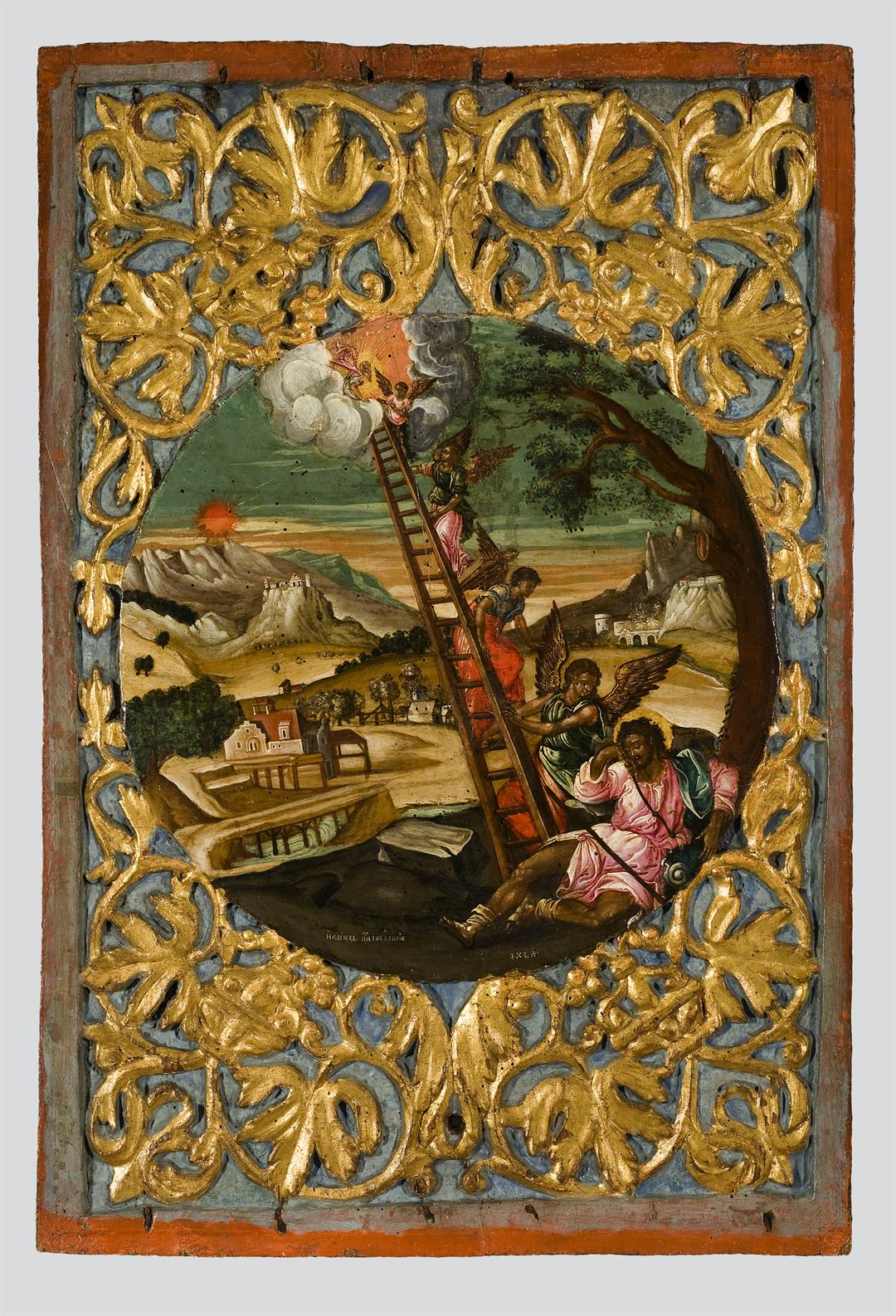
- Artist: Elias Moskos
- Year: c. 1664-1666
- Medium: tempera on wood
- Movement: Heptanese School
- Subject: Jacob’s Ladder
- Dimensions: 70 cm × 48 cm (27.6 in × 18.9 in)
- Location: Byzantine and Christian Museum, Athens, Greece
- Owner: Byzantine and Christian Museum
- Accession: ΒΧΜ 02056
- Website: Official Website

Jacob’s Ladder is a tempera painting created by Elias Moskos. Elias was a Greek painter originally from the island of Crete. By the 1650s he was living on the island of Zakynthos. He also worked on the island of Kefalonia. There were two other painters active during his lifetime with the same last name. Ioannis Moskos and Leos Moskos. The painter was also a prominent teacher. He also had a sizable fortune. Fifty-two of his paintings survived. He represented the Cretan School and the Heptanese School. His works typically combine both schools. His work was heavily influenced by engravings from all over the world; some were Flemish. His artistic activity ranged from 1629 to 1687. Most of his remaining works are in Greece and Italy.

Jacob was a biblical figure from the old testament. He had a vision of a ladder or staircase reaching into heaven with angels traveling up and down the ladder. He heard the voice of God blessing him from the top of the ladder. God made a covenant with Jacob just as he did with his father Isaac and his father's father, Abraham. God told Jacob he would be with him wherever he goes and that his descendants "shall be like the dust of the earth". God promised that through Jacob's offspring would come a "blessing" for all of the peoples of the earth- the Christian tradition regards this as a foretelling of the coming of Christ. Countless artists depicted the old testament scene. The theme was adopted by Flemish artists.

Rafael Sadeler was a Renaissance Flemish engraver. He was from Antwerp. He was active from 1575 to 1632. He was a prominent member of the Sadeler family. He was active in Venice, Munich, and Cologne. His brother was a famous engraver Jan Sadeler. The engravings of the Sadeler family heavily influenced the Greek art of the Heptanese School. Rafael Sadeler introduced German and Flemish art to the artistic community of Venice. Maerten de Vos was a Flemish painter. His work heavily influenced the engravings of the Sadeler family. Rafael Sadeler used Maerten de Vos's version of Jacob's later for inspiration. He created his own version with similar characteristics. Moskos in turn used Rafael Sadeler's engraving as innovation for his master piece. The work came from a church in Zakynthos. It was one of the panels of an iconostasis The work of art can be found at the Byzantine and Christian Museum.

== Description ==
The materials used for the painting were tempera paint and wood panel. The height of the icon is 70 cm (27.6 in) and the width is 48 cm (18.9 in). Moskos added a sunset to the background of the painting. A castle on a mountain is present in the engraving and the painting. The background to our right also features similar characteristics in both the engraving and the painting. The landscape differs slightly in the Moskos. A Baroque Rococo like decoration adorns the panel. The figure of Jacob is smaller in the Moskos. The artist animates the sketch by adding color to the printed engraving. Moskos humanizes the celestial figures. The artwork offers a clear three-dimensional image. Dreaming Jacob is greeted by an angel. The artist shows considerable knowledge about painting the human figure. Jacob's legs are sculpturesque. The angles reflect a childlike quality. The folds of fabric and coloration of the garments create a cohesive flow with fluttering lines. The heavenly figures float in a weightless setting. The work captivates the audience and brings Greek art out of the Cretan school into the more refined Heptanese School of painting.

== Gallery ==
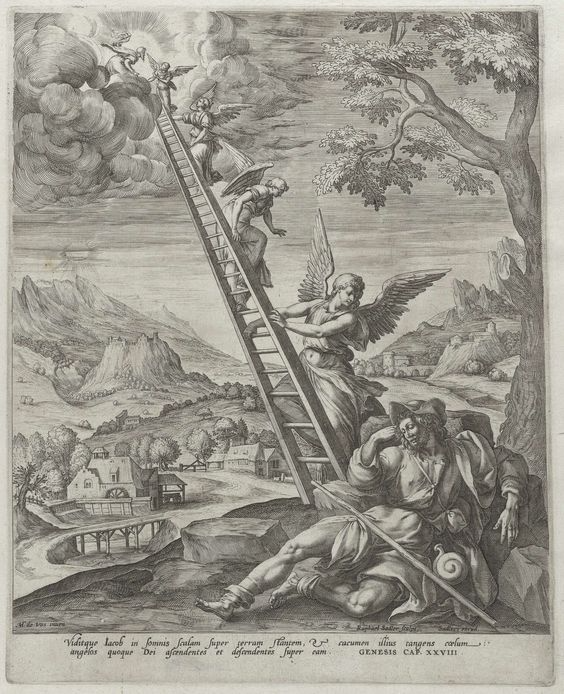
Jakob's Ladder R. Sadeler

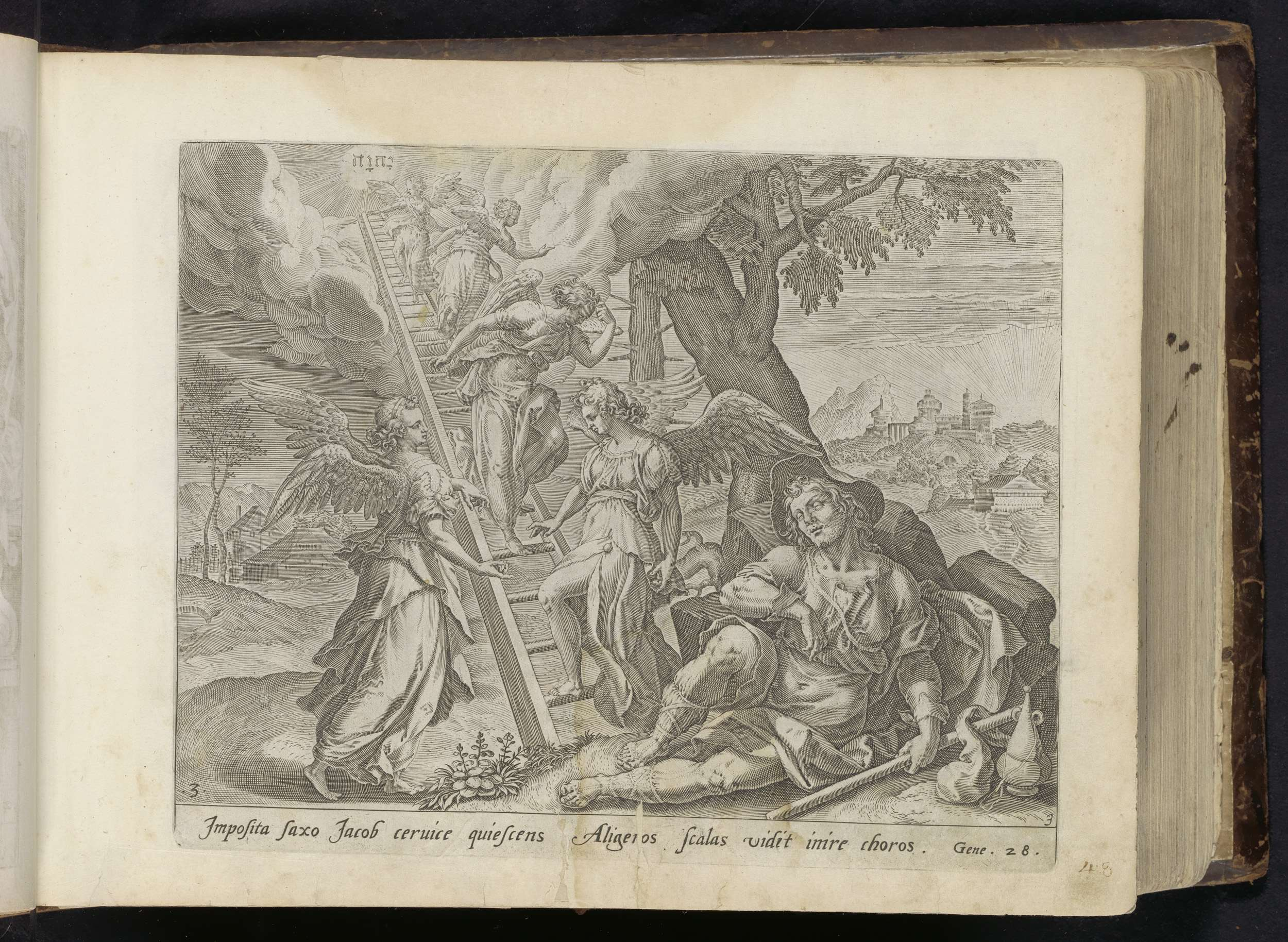
Jakobs ladder Maerten de Vos
