= Dionysios Vegias =

Greek painter

- Διονύσιος Βέγιας
- Born: 1810; Cephalonia, Greece
- Died: 1884 (aged 73–74); Corfu, Greece
- Occupation: Painter

Dionysios Vegias (Greek: Διονύσιος Βέγιας, 1810–84) was a Greek painter of the later Heptanese School of painting.

== Life ==
Dionysios Vegias was born in 1810 in Cephalonia. He was a pupil of the sculptor Pavlos Prosalentis (1784–1837), then received a scholarship from the Ionian Islands to study painting at the Accademia di San Luca in Rome. He proved an excellent pupil. He stayed in Italy for some time making copies of Renaissance genre paintings, which were popular with buyers at the time. In 1839 he returned to Corfu, where he taught drawing at the art school founded by Prosalentis. He then taught at the Lyceum of Corfu. He died in 1884 in Corfu.

== Work ==
Dionysios Vegias participated in the International Exhibition in London (1862) and in Olympia (1875). His paintings include portraits, historical scenes, religious paintings and mythological scenes such as Danae (1870), a relatively unusual genre in Ionian art. He was influenced by Italian painting, and depicted idealized forms and actions. He also made icons, and decorated the church of St. Spyridon in Argostoli, Our Lady of Strangers and St. George in the Old Fortress, Corfu.

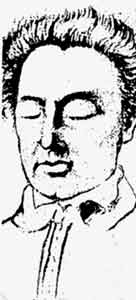
Sketch of the dead poet Dionysios Solomos (1857)

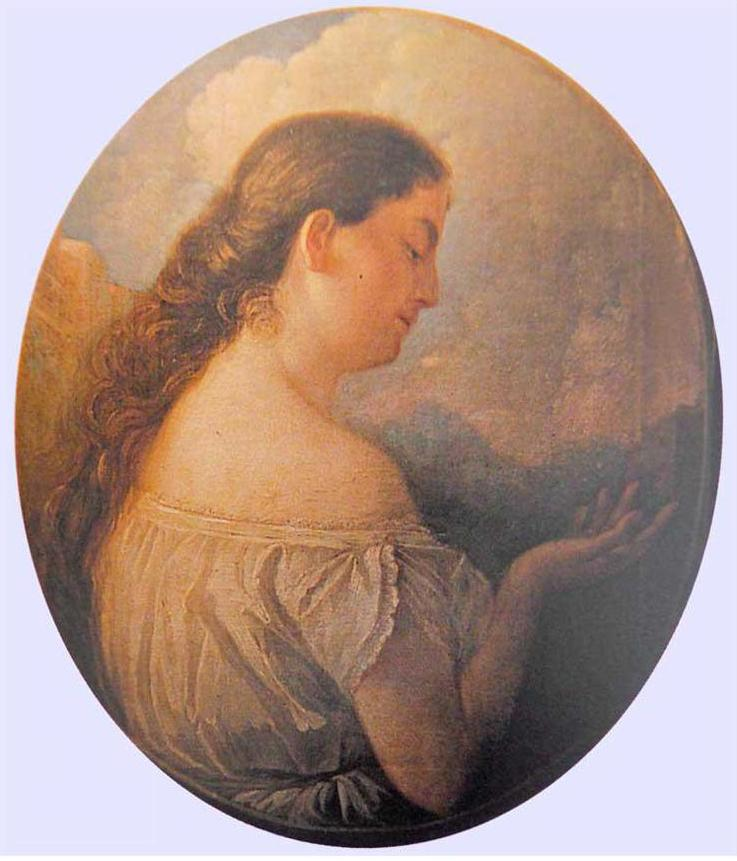
Danae (1870)

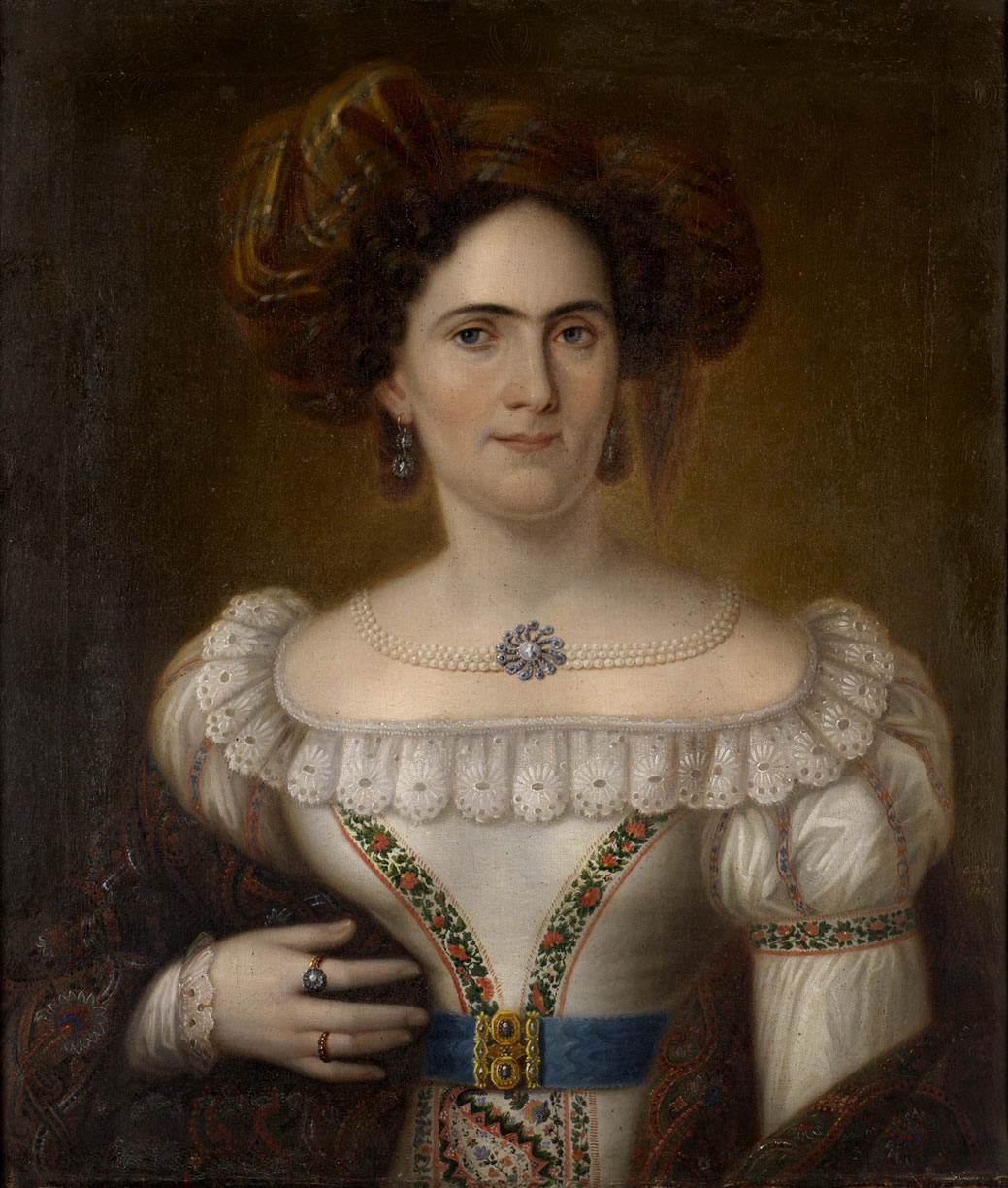
Portrait of a woman (1870) Municipal Art Gallery of Ioannina

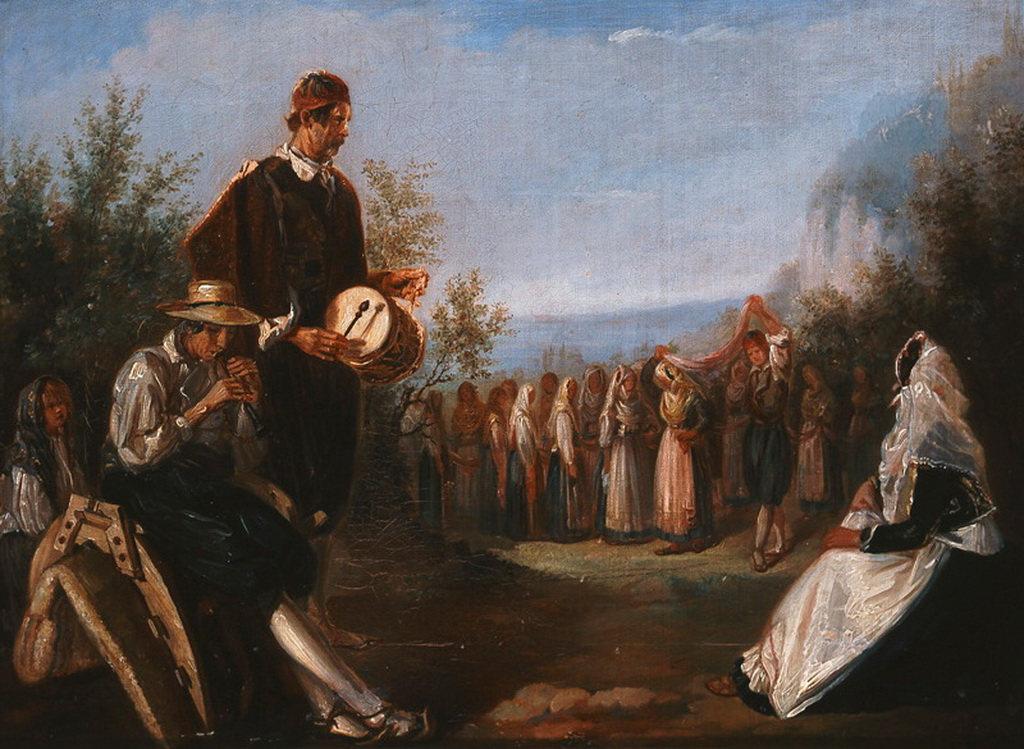
Dance in Corfu

== Sources ==
- Arta Greece (11 May 2014), Βέγιας Διονύσιος – Dionysios Vegias [1810-1884] (in Greek)
- "ΒΕΓΙΑΣ, ΔΙΟΝΥΣΙΟΣ", Ygeiaonline.gr (in Greek)
- "Βέγιας Διονύσιος", National Gallery of Greece (in Greek), archived from the original on 2014-05-12
