= Konstantinos Kontarinis =

Greek painter (1679–1738)

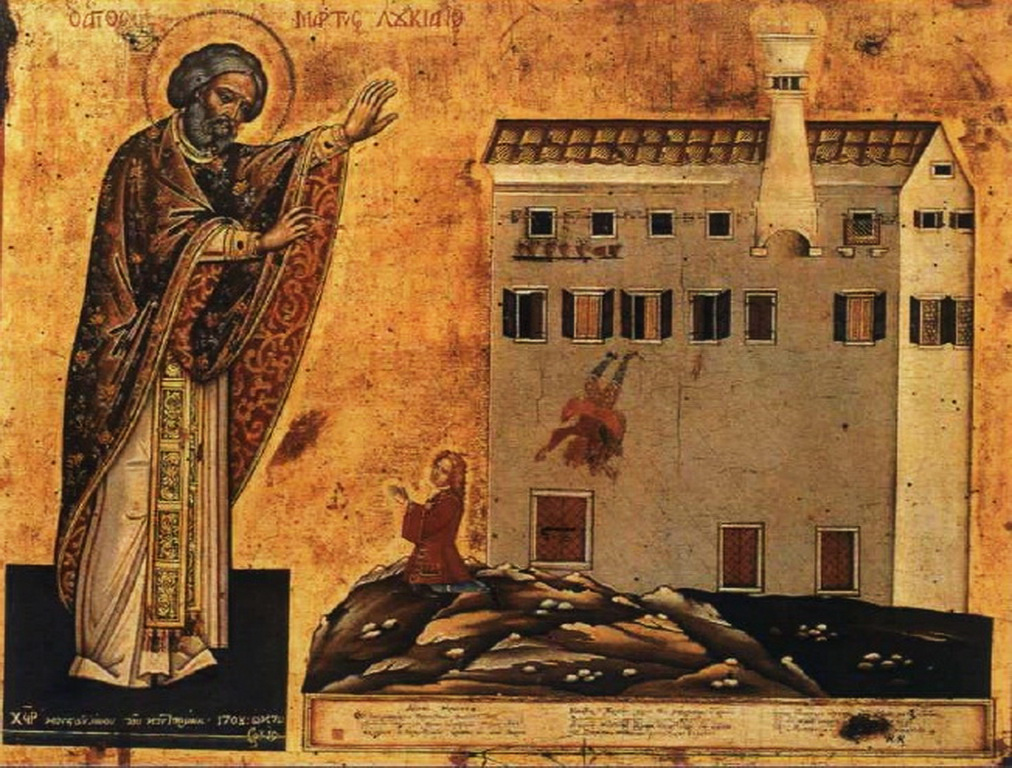
- Born: 1679; Corfu, Greece
- Died: 1738 (aged 58–59); Lefkada, Greece
- Known for: Iconography and hagiography
- Movement: Heptanese school Greek Baroque

Konstantinos Kontarinis (Greek: Κωνσταντίνος Κονταρίνης; 1679–1738), also known as Konstantino Kontarini, was a Greek Baroque painter of the Heptanese school. He was heavily influenced by the works of Theodore Poulakis. His contemporaries at the time were Stephano Tzangarola and Panagiotis Doxaras. His work signals a transition for the Cretan school to the more refined Heptanese school. Kontarinis clearly follows the traditional maniera greca. The art was heavily influenced by the Venetian style. He influenced the works of countless Greek and Italian painters namely Spyridon Sperantzas and Nikolaos Kallergis. According to the Institute of Neohellenic Research, eighty-five of his works survived. His most notable work is the portable icon consisting of Scenes from Genesis. It is featured at the Byzantine Museum Athens, Greece.

== History ==
Kontarinis was born on the island of Corfu. His family migrated from Rethymno, Crete. The family was featured in the works of Marinos Tzanes. Not much is known about his life. He was married. He had a son named Nicholas. He is mentioned in the archives of Corfu around 1715. He traveled around the Ionian Islands. By the 1730s he was in Lefkada. He was recorded on October 14, 1731. He was a witness. His work was heavily influenced by Theodore Poulakis, he was another Greek painter associated with the island of Corfu. Both of the artists are representatives of the Heptanese school

Kontarinis is among a unique class of Greek painters. He allowed patrons to be featured in his works. One such instance was Saint Lucian's Miracle, the Saving of Spyridon Voulgaris. Clearly, Voulgaris is the feature of the work. Stephanos Tzangarolas also employs a similar technique. He featured Bernardo (Vernardo) Aninou in his Virgin Glykofilousa. Franghias Kavertzas featured a nun named Evgenia Trapezontiopoulla at the bottom of his Last Judgment. She was also the patron of the masterpiece. Another impressive painting by Kontarinis Saint Alexander and Scenes of Martyrdom features a Camel. Greek painter Konstantinos Kontaris is often confused with Kontarinis due to the similarity of their names. Some theories evolved that Kontaris is Kontarinis. There is considerable debate regarding Kontarinis masterpiece Descent from the Cross.

== Gallery ==
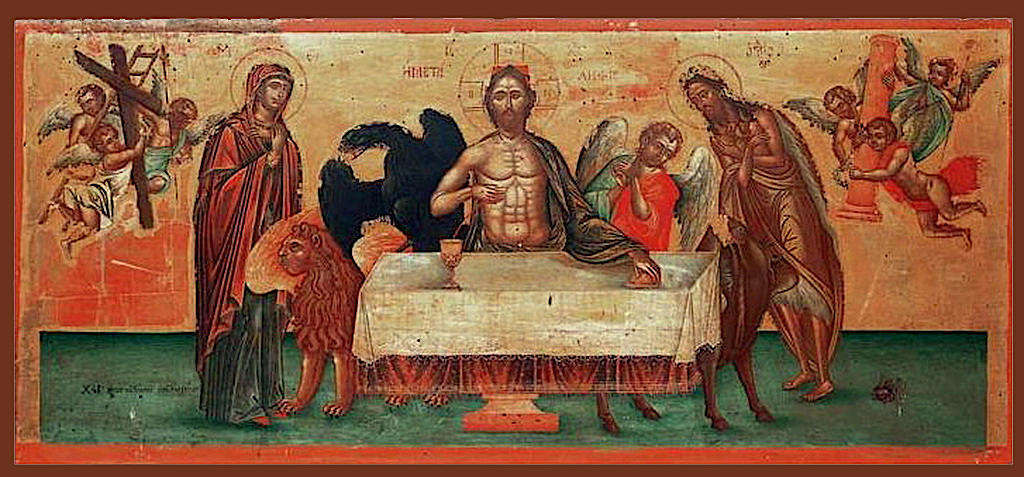
The Allegory of the Holy Communion

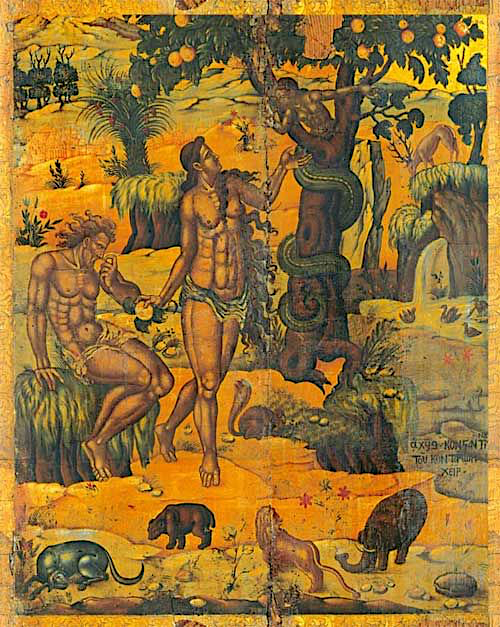
Adam and Eve

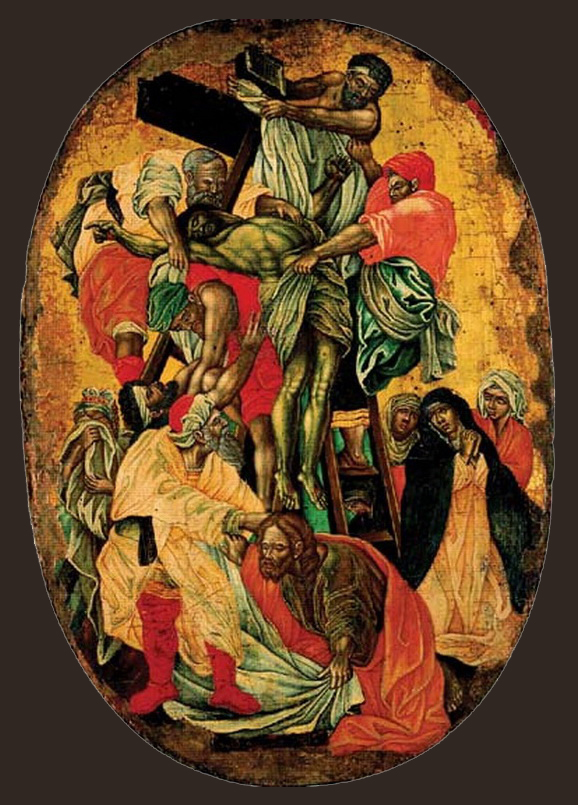
Circle of Kontarinis Descent from the Cross

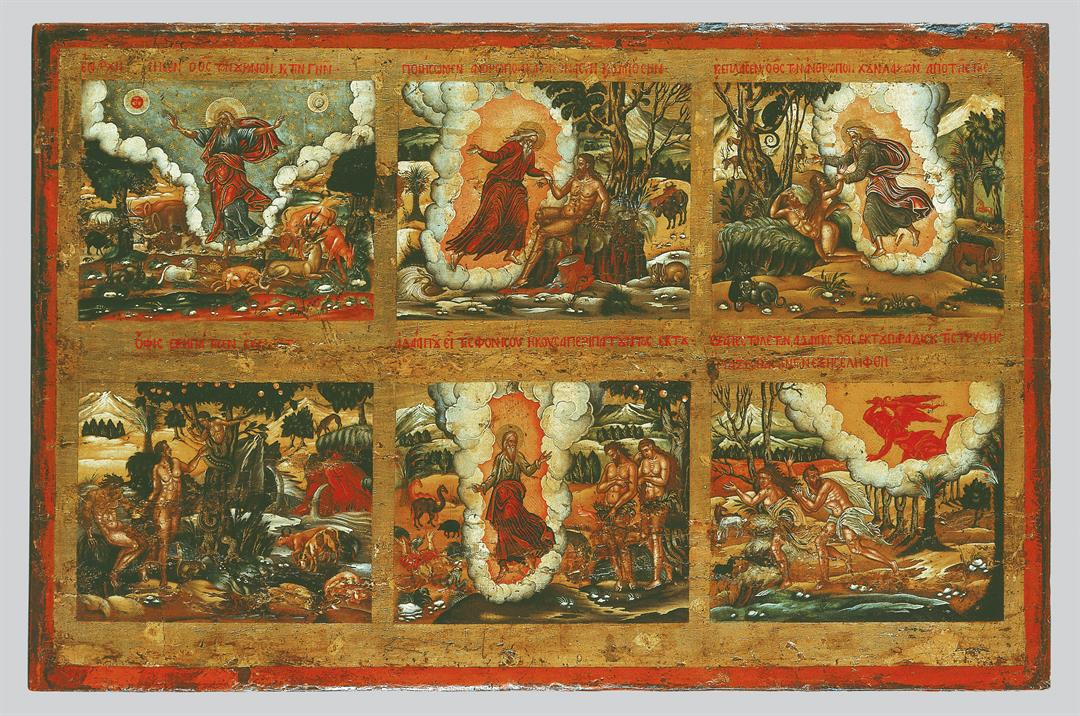
Scenes from Genesis

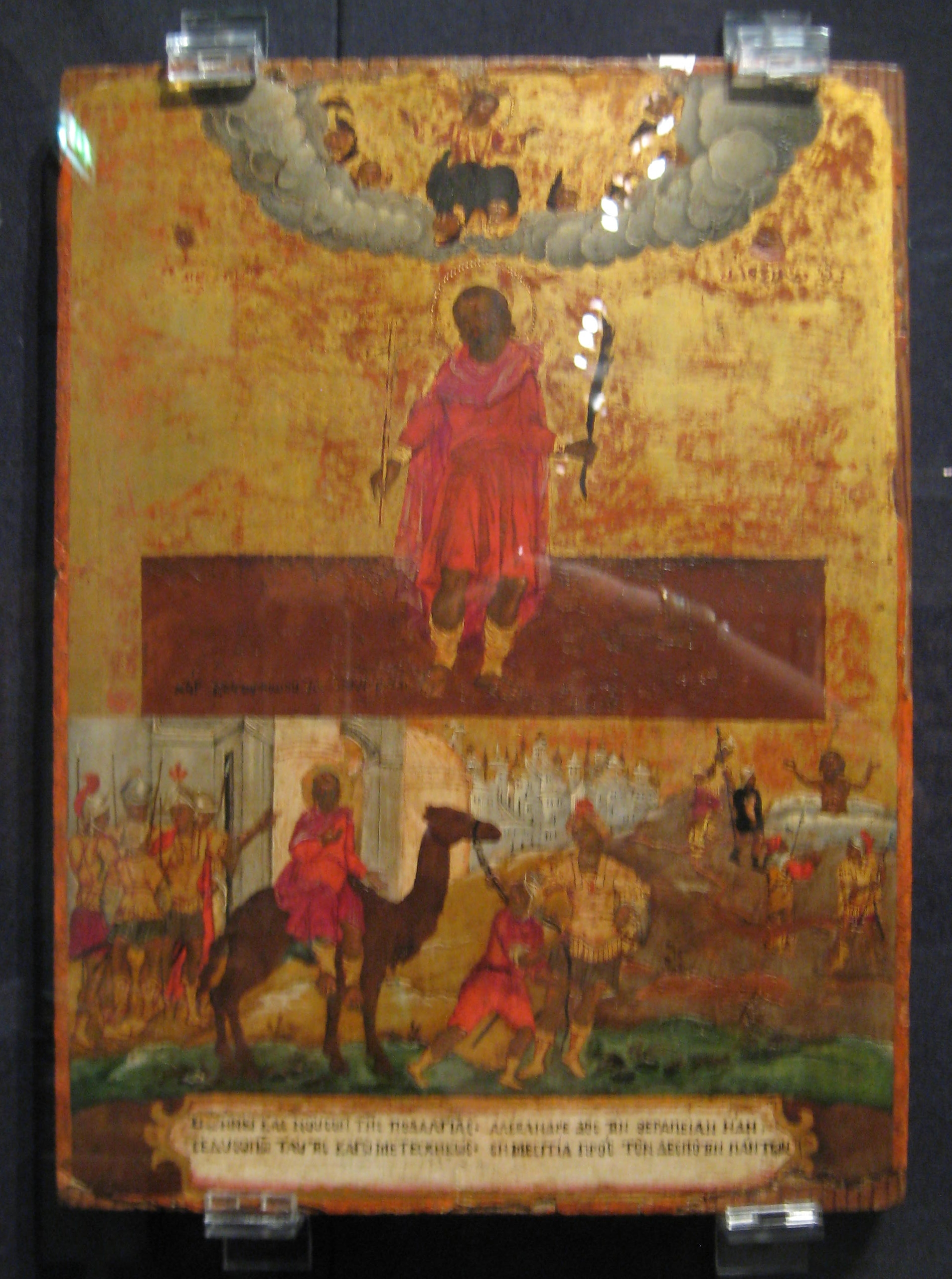
Saint Alexander and Scenes of Martyrdom

== Notable works ==
- Alypius Private Collection Kölliken Switzerland
- Entrance of the Virgin (ΘΚ), Noether Collection Mannheim, Germany

== See also ==
- Masaccio
- Spyridon Ventouras
