= Gerasimos Pitsamanos =

Greek architect and painter

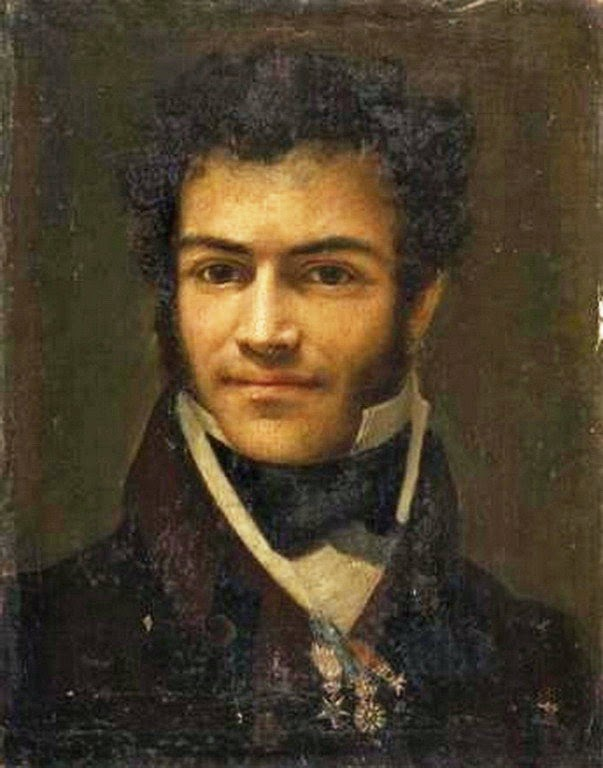
- Self-portrait, ca. 1817
- Born: Gerasimos Pitsamanos; 16 May 1787; Argostoli, Cephalonia
- Died: 5 December 1825 (aged 38); Corfu
- Known for: Portrait painting, architecture

Gerasimos Pitsamanos or Pitzamanos (Greek: Γεράσιμος Πιτσαμάνος or Πιτζαμάνος; 6 March 1787 – 5 December 1825) was a Greek architect and a portrait painter. Most of his known works are watercolors.

== Biography ==
He was born in the Ionian Islands to a family that was originally from Crete. His grandfather Konstantinos, a priest and painter, had come from there to work on the Church of the Holy Unmercenaries. His father, Vikentios, was also a priest and painter, so his artistic inclinations were encouraged and, after beginning his studies at home, was sent to Zakynthos to work with Nikolaos Kantounis.

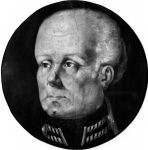
Portrait of Sir Thomas Maitland, Lord High Commissioner of the Ionian Islands (1815–1823)

In 1802, not long after the creation of the Septinsular Republic, he joined the Republic's army and became a captain in the engineering corps. Five years later, when the area reverted to French control, he was appointed Director of the topographical service and was assigned to map the islands and the coastal areas of Epirus. In 1809, he was part of a diplomatic mission to Ali Pasha. Later that year, the Ionian Senate sent him to Rome to complete his studies at public expense.

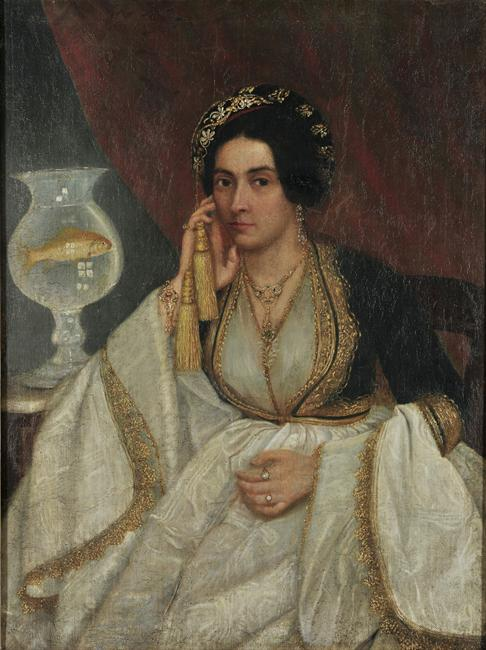
Portrait of Lady with a Fishbowl.

While there, he not only studied painting, but was involved in architecture and sculpture as well, becoming an associate of Antonio Canova. In 1812, he was named an honorary member of the Accademia di San Luca. During that time, he designed a triumphal arch, celebrating Napoleon's marriage and victories in Germany. His designs earned him the Order of the Reunion. In 1814, he returned home and worked as an architect for the civil service. A year later, when the islands changed hands again, he went to Paris, where he met with Adamantios Korais, who was unsuccessful at convincing him to become an art teacher and work at Korais' school on Chios. However, when the British regained control in 1817, he accepted a teaching position at the Ionian Academy.

In 1818, Sir Frederick Adam invited him along on trips to Ottoman occupied territories in Greece, where he made numerous sketches. They arrived in Istanbul in 1820, just before the beginning of the Greek Revolution, and he was initiated into a secret patriotic organization known as "Filiki Eteria". Following his participation in a protest-themed stage play, he had to seek refuge in the British Embassy.

In 1821, Ioannis Kapodistrias, who was then serving as Foreign Minister of the Russian Empire, invited him to work in Saint Petersburg as the court architect. He accepted but, a few years later, was diagnosed with tuberculosis and went to Italy seeking a cure. When it became obvious that he would not recover, he returned to Corfu, where he died, aged only thirty-eight.

== Gallery ==
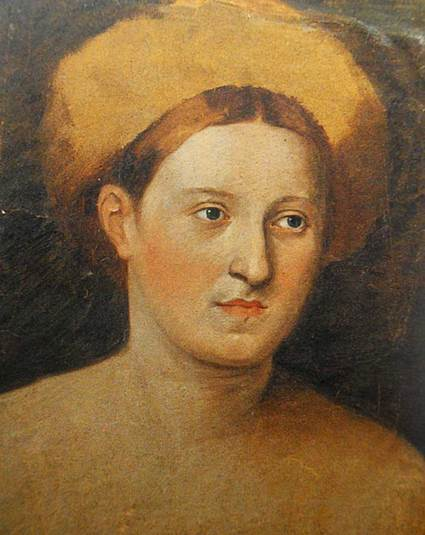
Portrait of a Lady

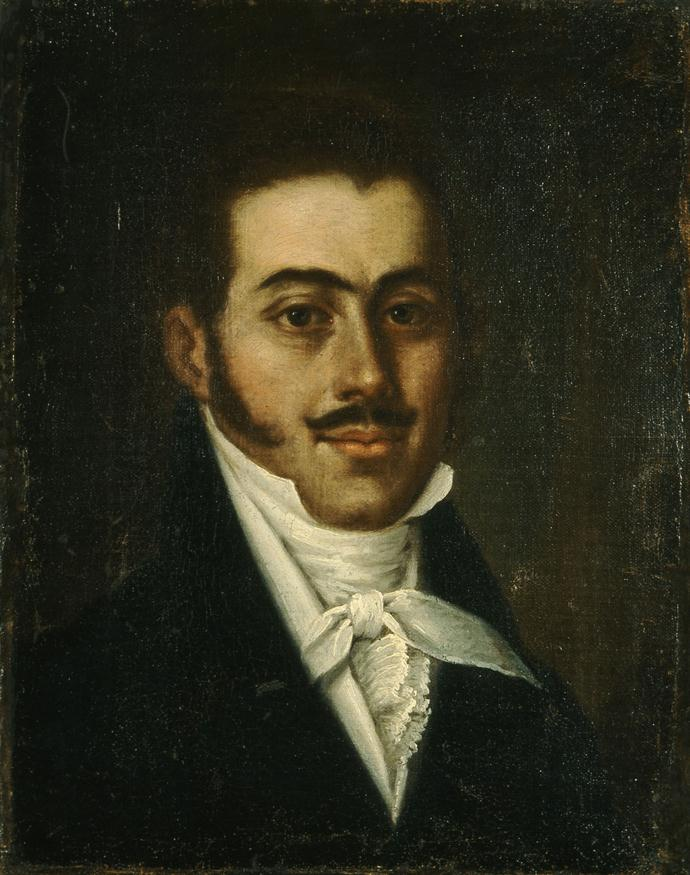
Portrait of
Panagiotis Benakis

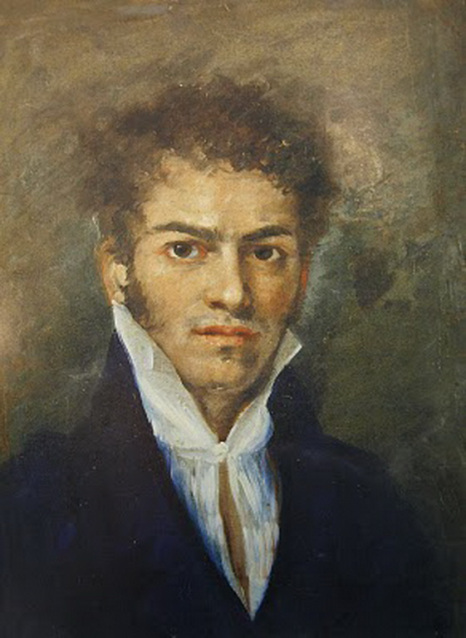
Self-portrait (1820)

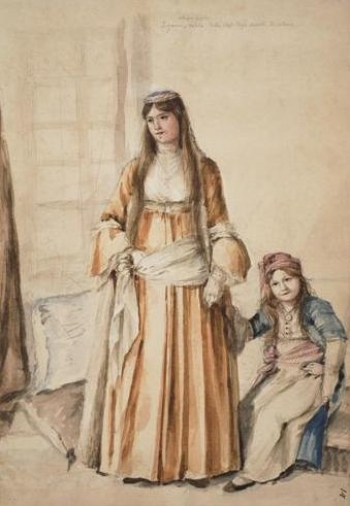
An Athenian Lady and Her Daughter

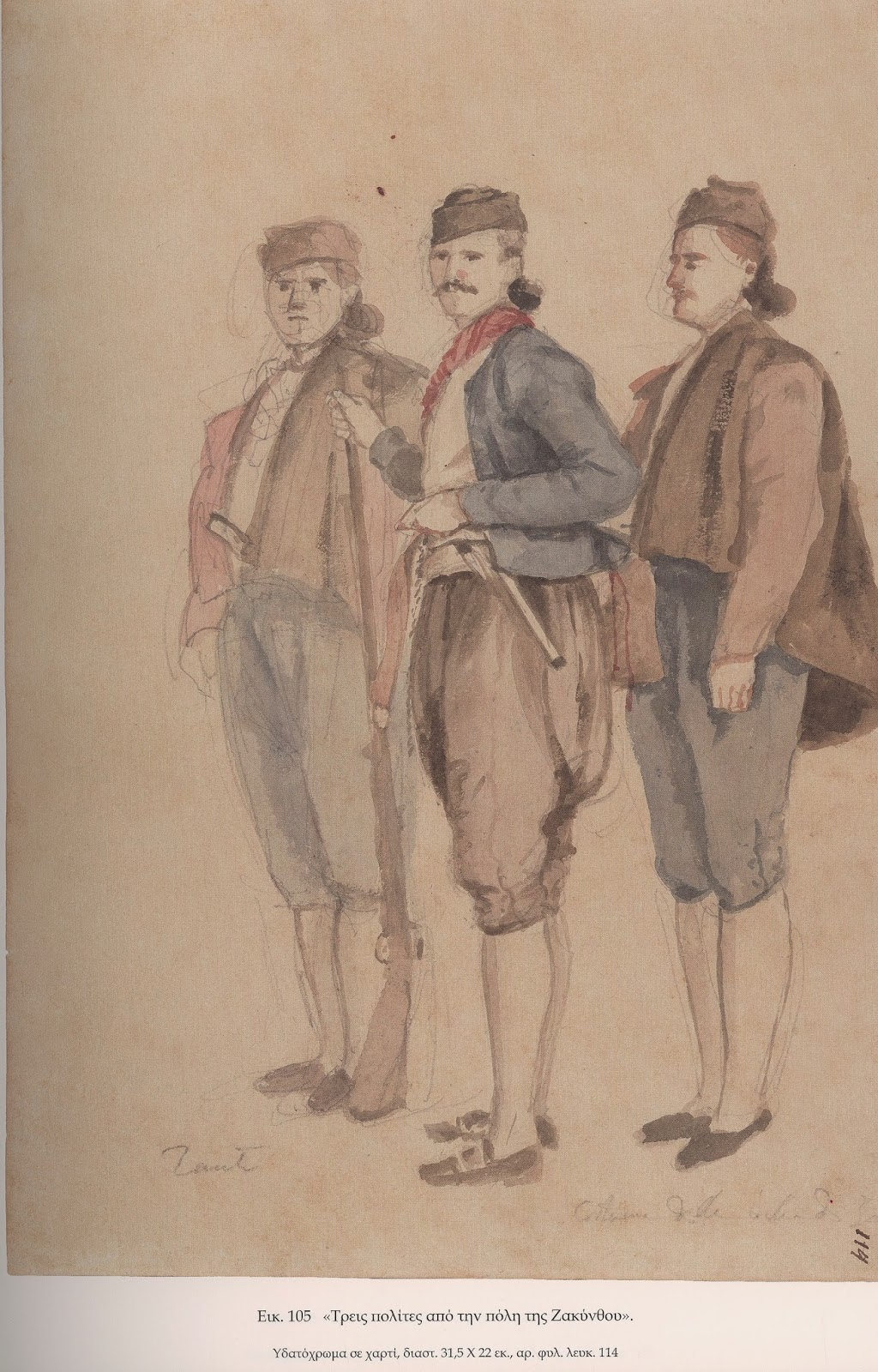
Three Cittadini

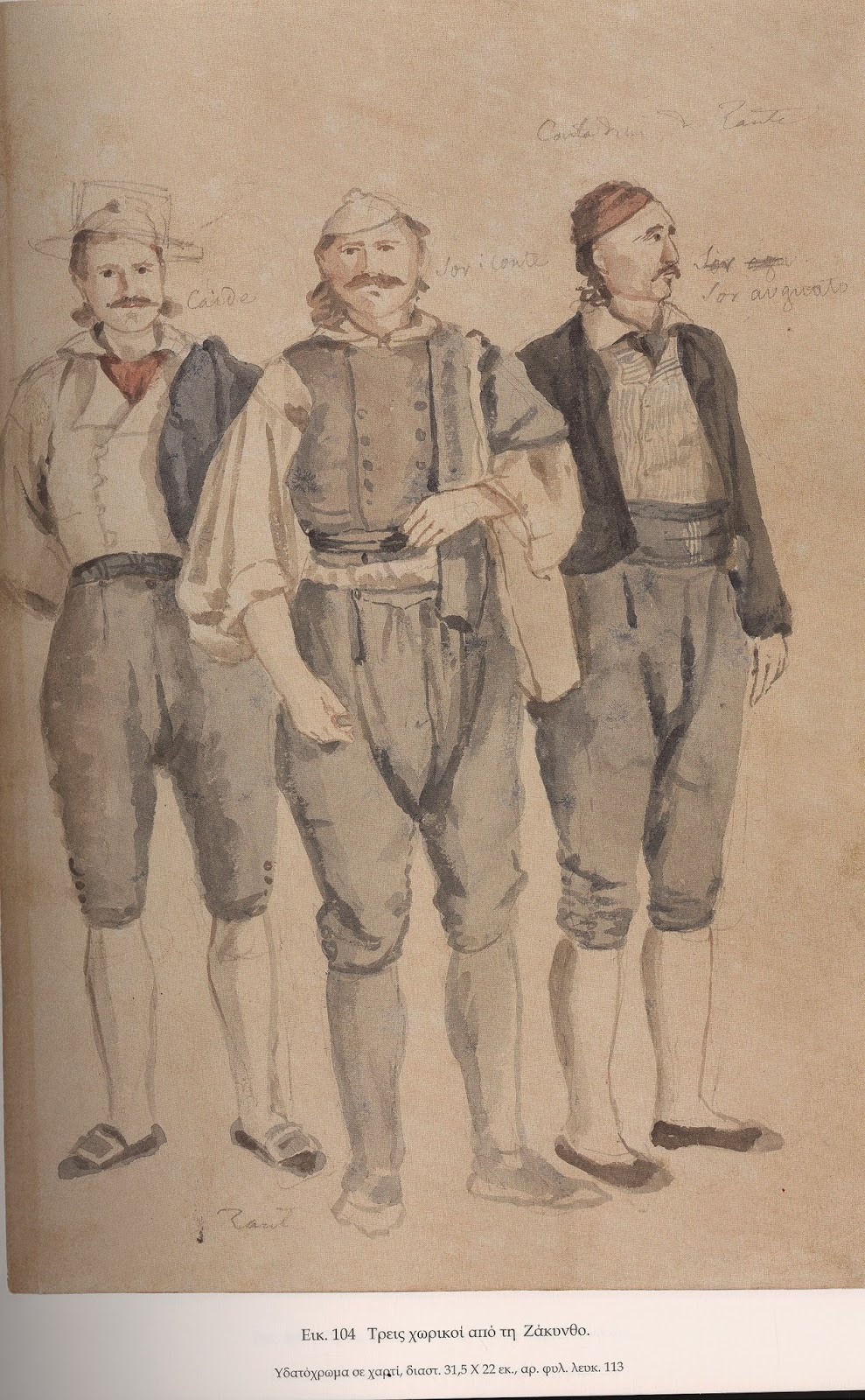
Three Zakynthians

== Bibliography ==
- Hatzidakis, Manolis; Drakopoulou, Evgenia (1997). Έλληνες Ζωγράφοι μετά την Άλωση (1450-1830). Τόμος 2: Καβαλλάρος - Ψαθόπουλος [Greek Painters after the Fall of Constantinople (1450-1830). Volume 2: Kavallaros - Psathopoulos]. Athens: Center for Modern Greek Studies, National Research Foundation. hdl:10442/14088. ISBN 960-7916-00-X.
