= Vikentios Lantsas =

Italian-born Greek painter and art professor

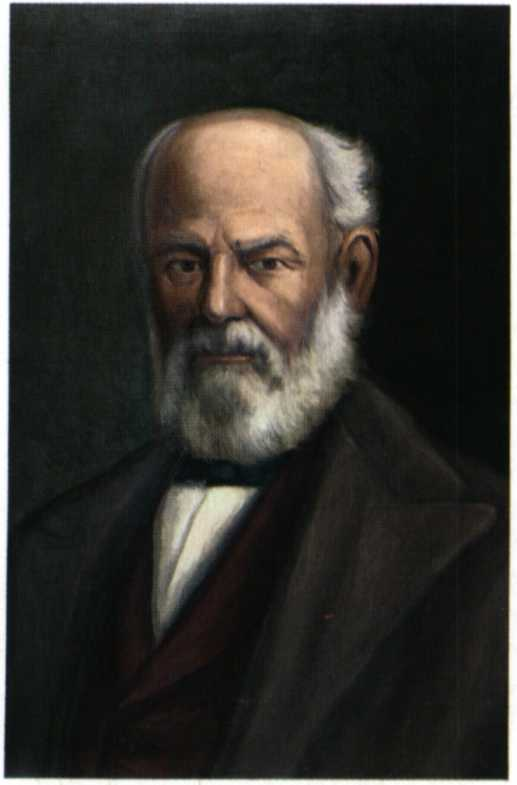
- Born: Vicenzo Lanza; 1822; Venice, Italy
- Died: 1902 (aged 79–80); Athens, Greece
- Education: Accademia di Belle Arti di Venezia
- Occupation: Painter
- Children: 1

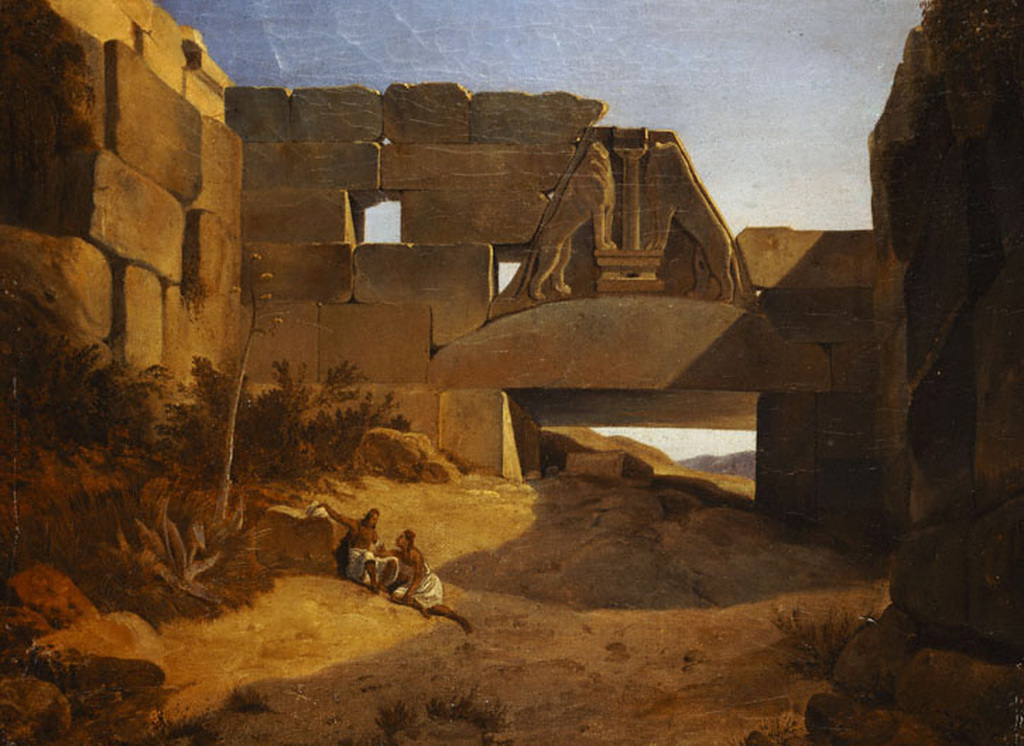
The Lion Gate, Mycenae

Vikentios Lantsas, originally Vicenzo Lanza (Greek:Βικέντιος Λάντσας; 1822—1902) was an Austrian Empire-born Greek painter and art professor; primarily known for his murals and depictions of Ancient Greek buildings. Most of his works were watercolors.

== Biography ==
He was a graduate of the Accademia di Belle Arti di Venezia. For a time, he remained at the Accademia, serving as an Assistant Professor in the department of perspective. In 1848, he joined the Revolution against the Austrian Empire, which controlled Venice at that time. He was a junior lieutenant in the Revolutionary Fleet. When the uprising was suppressed, he joined hundreds of other revolutionaries who fled to Greece, where they had been offered political asylum by Prime Minister Konstantinos Kanaris.

He initially settled in Patras. After two years, he moved to Athens. Once there, he received the support of Queen Amalia, who hired him to decorate the suburban Royal Residence. In turn, King Otto engaged him to work at the Russian Orthodox Church of the Holy Trinity. There, he completed paintings that had been begun by the German artist, Ludwig Thiersch, and his assistant, Nikiforos Lytras. For this work, he was awarded a gold medal by Tsar Alexander III. This was followed by another commission from the King; to paint the ceilings at the University of Athens.

In 1862, King Otto was toppled by a coup. Over the next year, many people were dismissed from their posts, including some at the Athens School of Fine Arts. In 1863, Lantsas was accepted there as a teacher; a position he held until 1901. He taught perspective, set design, elementary graphics and decorative arts. During that same period, he also taught at the Hellenic Military Academy.

He participated and won medals in numerous exhibitions, including the Exposition Universelle (1867) in Paris, and occasionally sat as a judge in art competitions. He was also a recipient of the Order of the Redeemer. After the Risorgimento, the Italian government awarded him three medals; one for his participation in the Revolution.

He died in 1902, at the age of eighty. His son, Stefanos, also became a noted landscape painter.
