= Ioanni Korai =

Greek painter

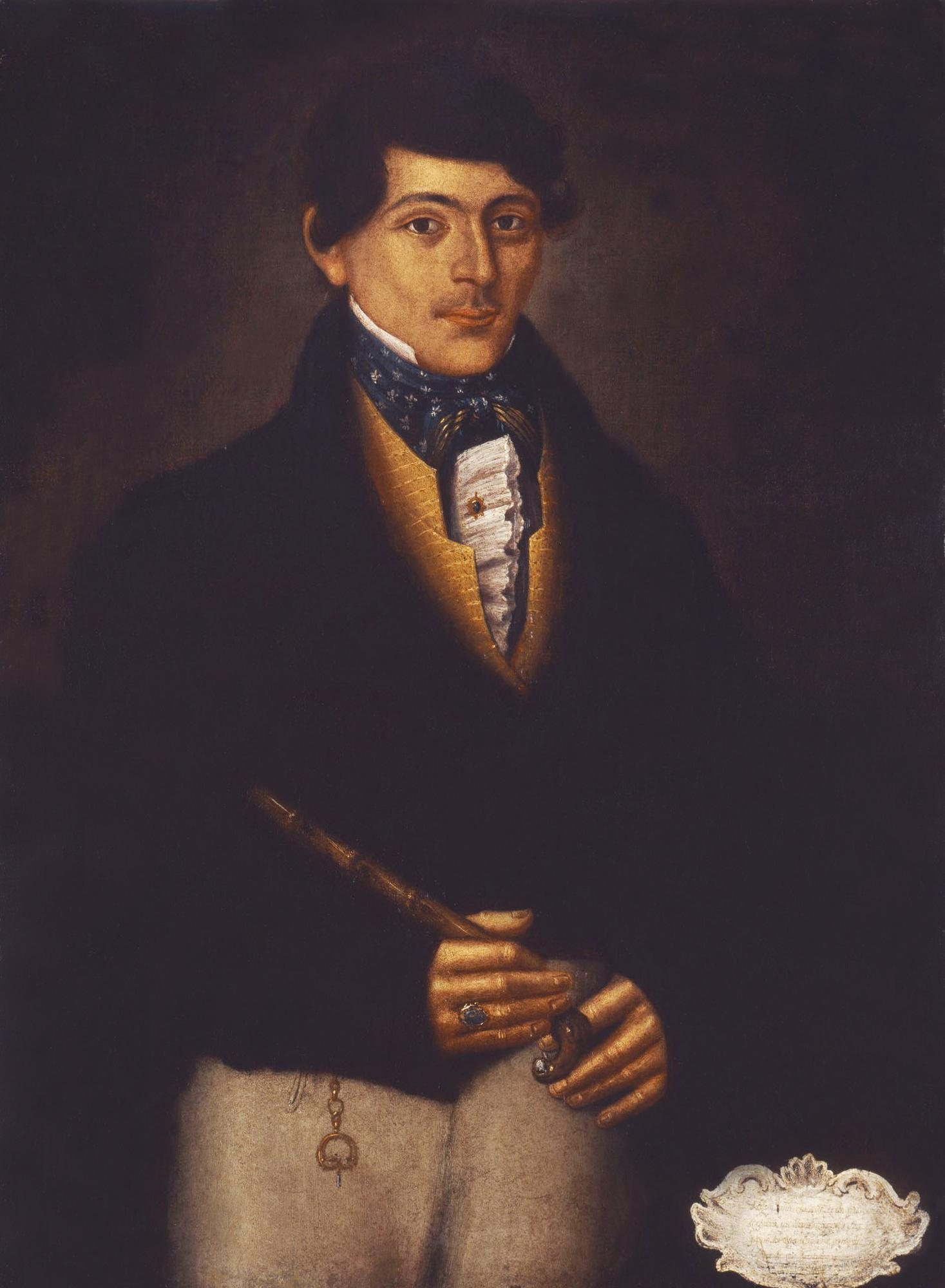
- Portrait of Kyriakos Chorafas
- Born: c. 1781; Zakynthos, Greece
- Died: 1841 (aged 59–60); Zakynthos, Greece
- Movement: Heptanese School; Greek Romanticism

Ioanni Korai (Greek: Ιωάννης Κοραής, c. 1781 – 1841; also known as Ioannis Korais or Kastrinos) was a Greek painter that shared the same name as his famous uncle Ioannis Korais. He was a prominent painter on the Ionian Islands. His family migrated to Zakynthos from Chios. He was a member of the Heptanese School. His contemporaries were Dionysios Kallivokas and Nikolaos Koutouzis. He was taught painting by Ioannis Korais. He was active during the Modern Greek Enlightenment and Greek romanticism in art. He influenced countless Greek and Italian painters. Korai brought Greek artwork into the Modern Greek art period. Twelve of his paintings survived. His most notable painting is a portrait of Kyriakos Chorafas painted in 1826. The painting is at the National Gallery of Athens.

== History ==
Korai was born on the island of Zakynthos. He was one of the descendants of the famous painter Michael Korais. They were a prominent family from Chios. His uncle was Ioannis Korais; he inherited his tools for painting. Ioannis Korais also taught him painting; he died in 1799. Korai is first mentioned in the archives of the church of Agios Charalambos in Zakynthos at Potami. He was paid 52 realia in 1810.

He painted the iconostasis of the churches of Hodegetria and Agios Nikolaos of Geronton, as well as the iconostasis of Agios Nikolaos in 1815. He remained on the island of Zakynthos when the Greek war of independence broke out. He died in 1841 in the Martinegos poorhouse on the island of Zakynthos. Icons of the Iconostasis of both Saint Basils and Agios Nikolaos ton Geronton that were in Zakynthos were lost in fires.

== See also ==
- Nikolaos Kantounis
- El Greco

== Bibliography ==
- Hatzidakis, Manolis (1987). Greek painters after the fall (1450-1830) Volume A. Athens, GR: Center for Modern Greek Studies E.I.E.
- Hatzidakis, Manolis & Drakopoulou, Eugenia (1997). Greek painters after the fall (1450-1830) Volume B. Athens, GR: Center for Modern Greek Studies E.I.E.
- Drakopoulou, Eugenia (2010). Greek painters after the fall (1450-1830) Volume C. Athens, GR: Center for Modern Greek Studies E.I.E.
