= Nikolaos Kallergis =

Greek painter

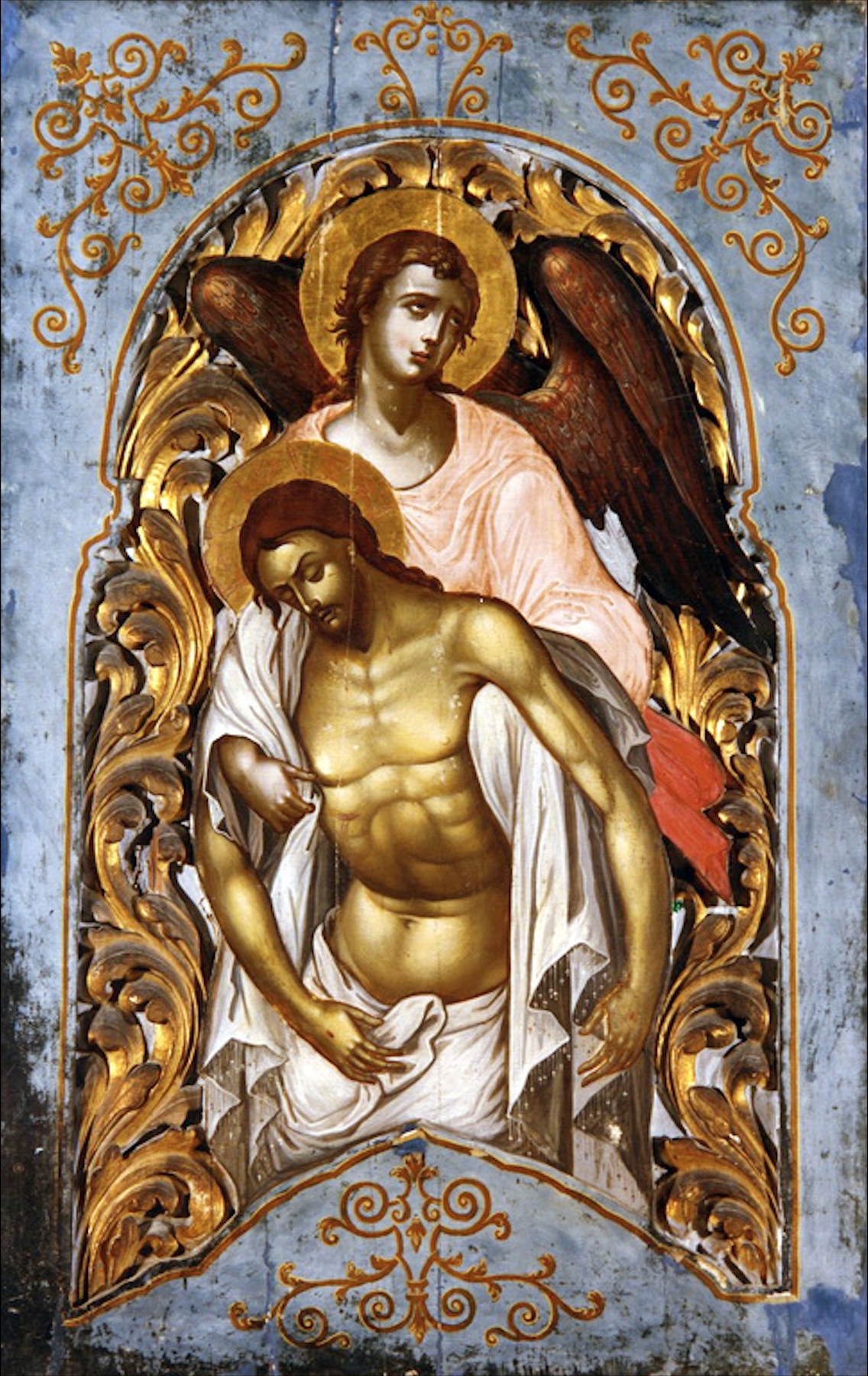
- Angel and Jesus
- Born: 1699; Zakynthos, Greece
- Died: 1747 (aged 47–48); Zakynthos, Greece
- Known for: Painter
- Movement: Heptanese School; Neoclassicism; Greek Rocco

Nikolaos Kallergis (Greek: Νικόλαος Καλλέργης; 1699–1747), also known as Kalergis. He was a Greek painter during the Greek Rococo and the Modern Greek Enlightenment in art also known as Neo-Hellenikos Diafotismos. His art also exhibited Venetian influence. Painters of the maniera greca began to refine their art. Philotheos Skoufos, Elias Moskos, and Theodore Poulakis were all active painters on the Ionian Islands prior to Kallergis. They set the stage for the transition to the Heptanese School. Panagiotis Doxaras is the forefather of the new painting style. He was the father of Greek Rococo and the Modern Greek Enlightenment in painting. Kallergis became an active member of the school. Kallergis also represents the Greek Rococo. His art began to exhibit qualities of Greek and Italian Neoclassicism. His style influenced countless painters. Examples include Nikolaos Kantounis, Nikolaos Koutouzis, Nikolaos Doxaras, Spiridione Roma, and Eustathios Karousos. His most famous work is Christ and Angel it is at the Zakynthos Museum.

== History ==
Kallergis was born in Zakynthos. His mother's name was Helena and his father was famous painter and priest Fragiskos Kalergis. The family was originally from Rethymno Crete. They migrated to Zakynthos before he was born. The local Metropolitan Priest Iosef Doksas bequeathed the Church of Saint Anna of Zakynthos to his father. His only sister Anastasia was given the church and a massive library. He also had three brothers. His father died on March 20, 1728, and was buried in the family church. Famous Cretan poet Marino Tzanes discussed the Kallergis family in his writing.

Nikolaos was taught painting from a young age. Historical documentation regarding Nikolaos is dated from 1744 regarding a painting in the Church of Faneromenis in Zakynthos. He painted an icon of Jesus Christ. Kallergis refined the Heptanese Art. His father was a member of the late Cretan Renaissance. Nikolaos, Panagiotis Doxaras, Nikolaos Kantounis, Nikolaos Doxaras and Nikolaos Koutouzis were all members of the Heptanese School. Kallergis takes us into the late-Baroque or Rococo during the Modern Greek Enlightenment in art also known as Neo-Hellenikos Diafotismos. According to the Institute of Neohellenic Research, thirty-two paintings have survived. He also painted frescos in the family church, Saint Anna of Zakynthos.

== Gallery ==
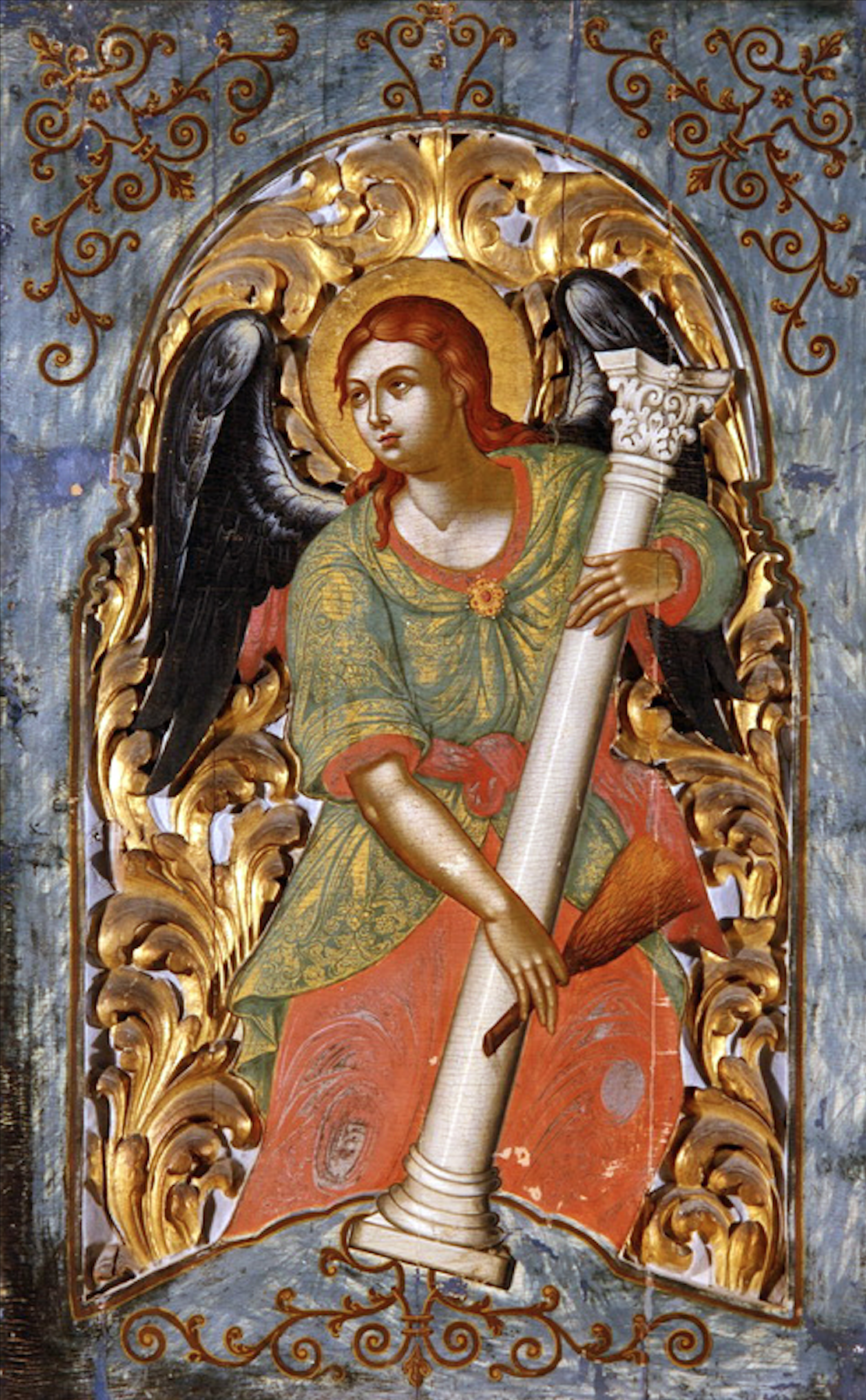
Angel with Column

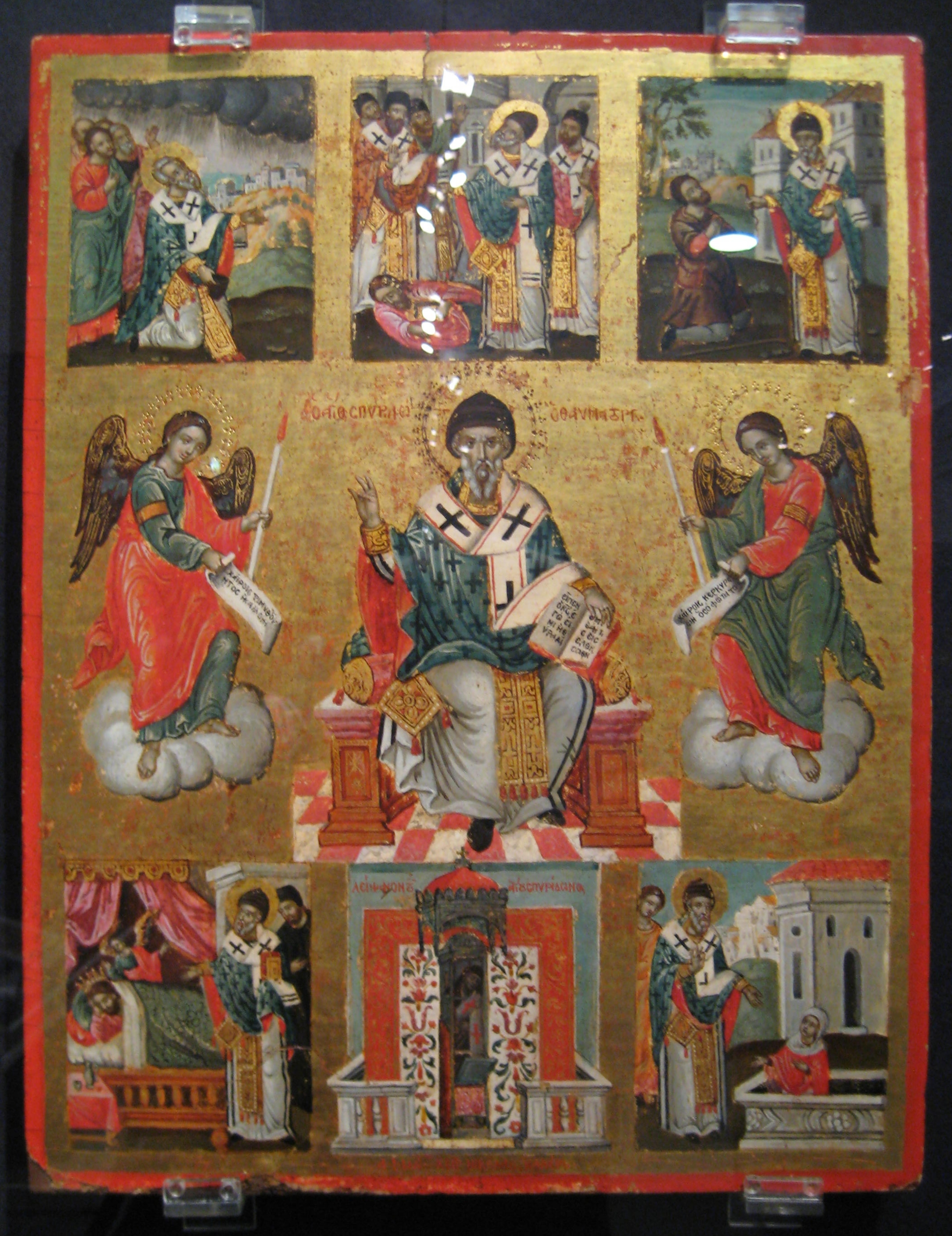
Saint Spyridon

== Notable works ==
- Virgin and Saint John, Collection of P. Modinou, Paris, France
- Angel Holding the Body of Christ

== See also ==
- Kallergis family
- Stylianos Stavrakis

== Bibliography ==
- Hatzidakis, Manolis (1987). Greek painters after the fall (1450-1830) Volume A. Athens, GR: Center for Modern Greek Studies E.I.E.
- Hatzidakis, Manolis & Drakopoulou, Eugenia (1997). Greek painters after the fall (1450-1830) Volume B. Athens, GR: Center for Modern Greek Studies E.I.E.
- Drakopoulou, Eugenia (2010). Greek painters after the fall (1450-1830) Volume C. Athens, GR: Center for Modern Greek Studies E.I.E.
