= Lamentation of Christ (Kantounis) =

Painting by Nikolaos Kantounis

- Αποκαθήλωση (Greek), Compianto sul Cristo morto (Italian)
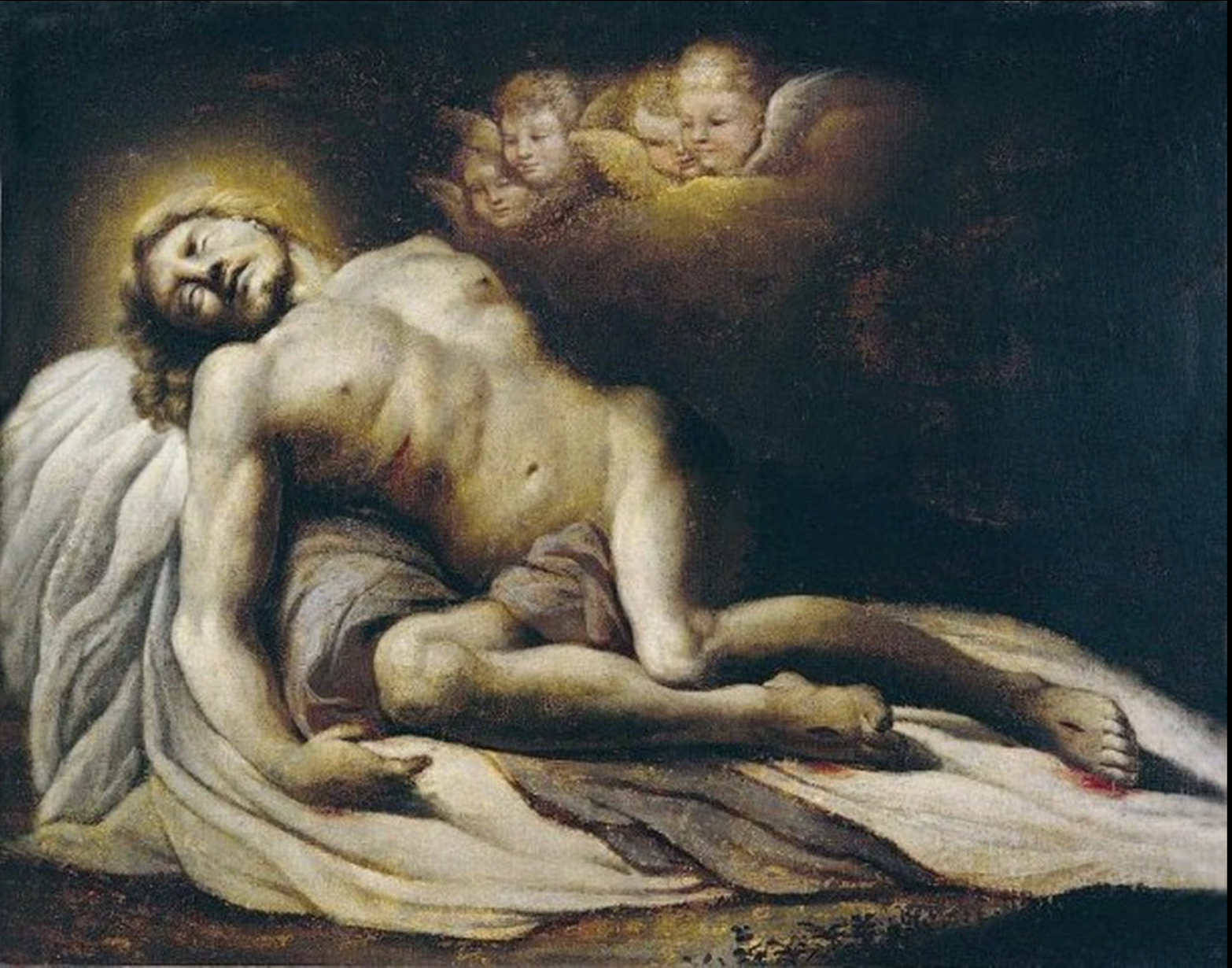
- Artist: Nikolaos Kantounis
- Year: 1790-1834
- Medium: oil on canvas
- Movement: Heptanese School
- Subject: Lamentation of Christ
- Dimensions: 48.5 cm × 61 cm (19 in × 24 in)
- Location: Municipal Art Gallery of Larissa; Larissa, Greece
- Owner: Municipal Art Gallery of Larissa
- Website: Official Website

Lamentation of Christ is an oil painting created by Greek painter Nikolaos Kantounis. He was a painter and teacher. He was a priest. His teachers were famous painters Ioannis Korais and Nikolaos Koutouzis He was a representative of the Heptanese School. His artwork was created during the Neoclassical and Romantic periods in Greek art. He was active on the island of Zakynthos from 1782–1834. He was one of the earliest members of the modern Greek art period. Over 164 of his paintings have survived. He is known for painting many portraits. He was a member of the secret organization for Greek Independence called the Filiki Eteria. Towards the end of his life he was honored with the rank of Grand Sakellarios.

The Passion of Jesus has been depicted in countless paintings both Greek and Italian. The Lamentation of Christ or Pietà was a popular theme adopted by the Cretan School. Andreas Pavias and Nikolaos Tzafouris both featured works in the traditional Greek style. Greek art began to evolve and integrate Venetian painting styles. By the Late Cretan and early Heptanese School. Greek artists began to integrate Flemish engravings into their paintings. By the 1800s Nikolaos Doxaras and Panagiotis Doxaras attempted to popularize oil painting. Panagiotis Doxaras significantly refined the Greek style but did not have the commercial success of El Greco with Renaissance Baroque style oil paintings. Nikolaos Kantounis had a very successful workshop. He was able to successfully maintain a workshop that emulated Renaissance Baroque-style oil paintings. His Lamentation of Christ resembles Andrea Mantegna's Lamentation of Christ. The work is part of the collection of the Municipal Art Gallery of Larissa in Greece.

== Description ==
The materials used were oil paint on canvas. The height of the painting is 48.5 cm (19 in) and the width is 61 cm (24 in). The work resembles Andrea Mantegna's Lamentation of Christ. Both works of art feature incredible craftsmanship. The crucifixion wounds of Jesus Christ are present in both paintings. Mantegna used tempera on canvas and Kantounis used oil on canvas. Andrea Mantegna's work features four wounds. Kantouni's work exhibits three of the holy wounds and an aura. A nimbus of power flows around Christ, glowing like the sun. Kantounis and his contemporaries of the Heptanese school began to refine and develop the human anatomy. Artists focused on definition and form. Kantounis did not hesitate to distinguish the biceps, triceps, and deltoid muscles. A pale figure appears. Both Mantegna and Kantouni's paintings feature a realistic depiction of a dead Christ. The flesh tones of the angels in Kantouni's painting allow viewers to distinguish the pale figure. His celestial statue-like body rests on his burial shroud. The holy shroud is marked with blood stains. The shroud often referred to as the holy towel is painted with light and shadow. The image relays a deep sense of realism. The cadaver magnificently communicates the biblical tragedy. The face of the holy martyr imparts the same tone as Mantegna's work. The four angels convey hope to onlookers.

== Gallery ==
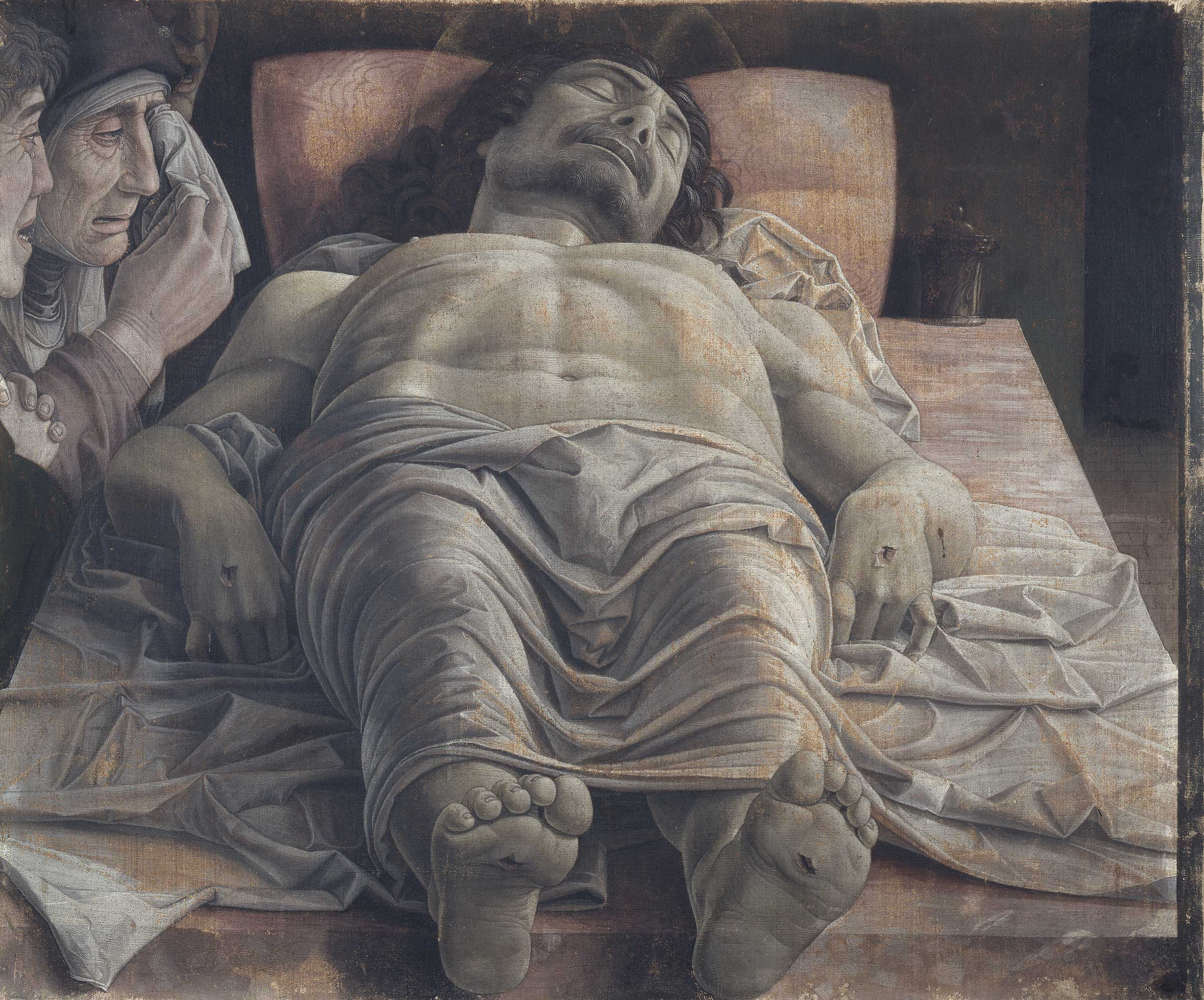
Mantegna's Lamentation of Christ

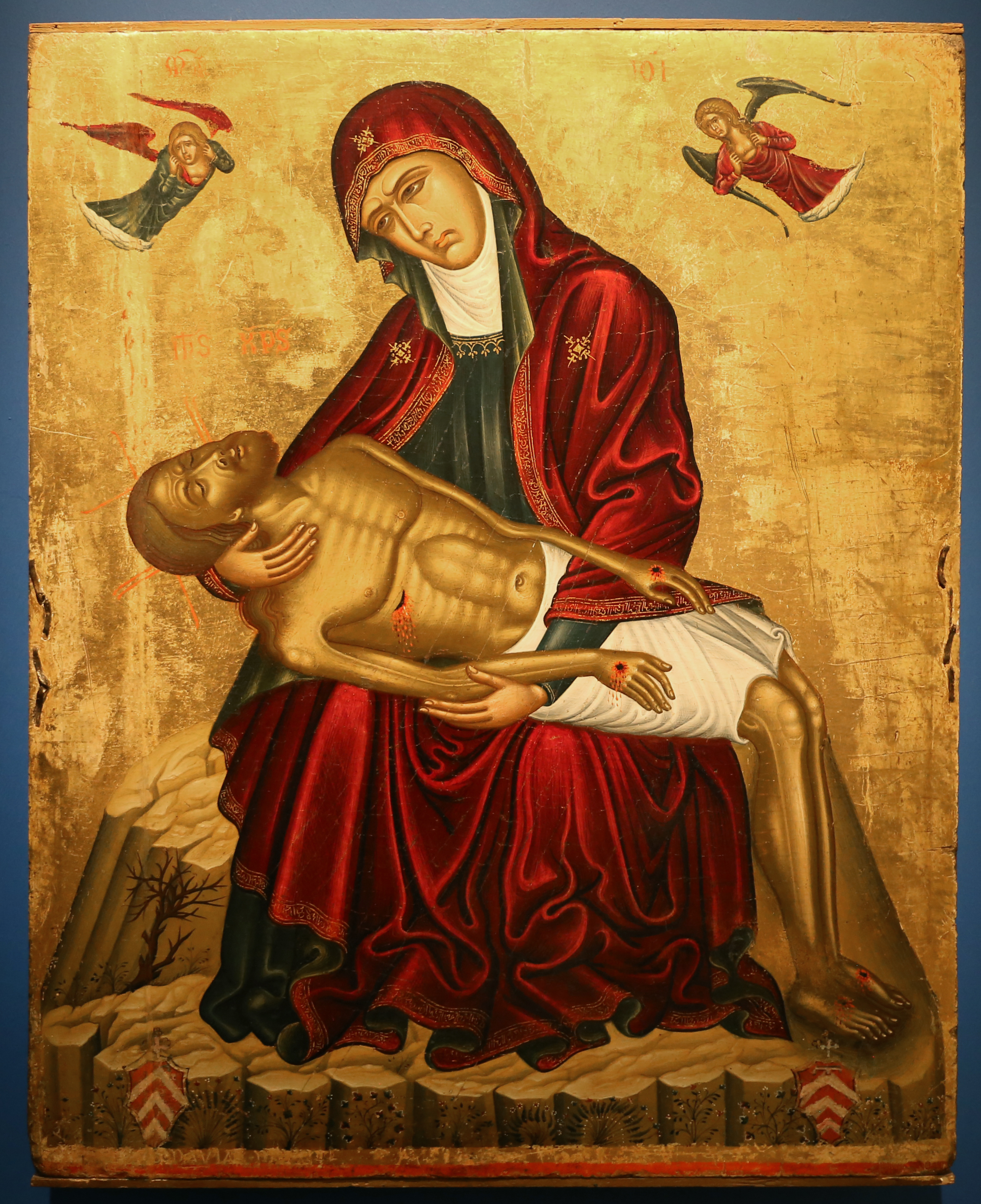
Pietà Pavias

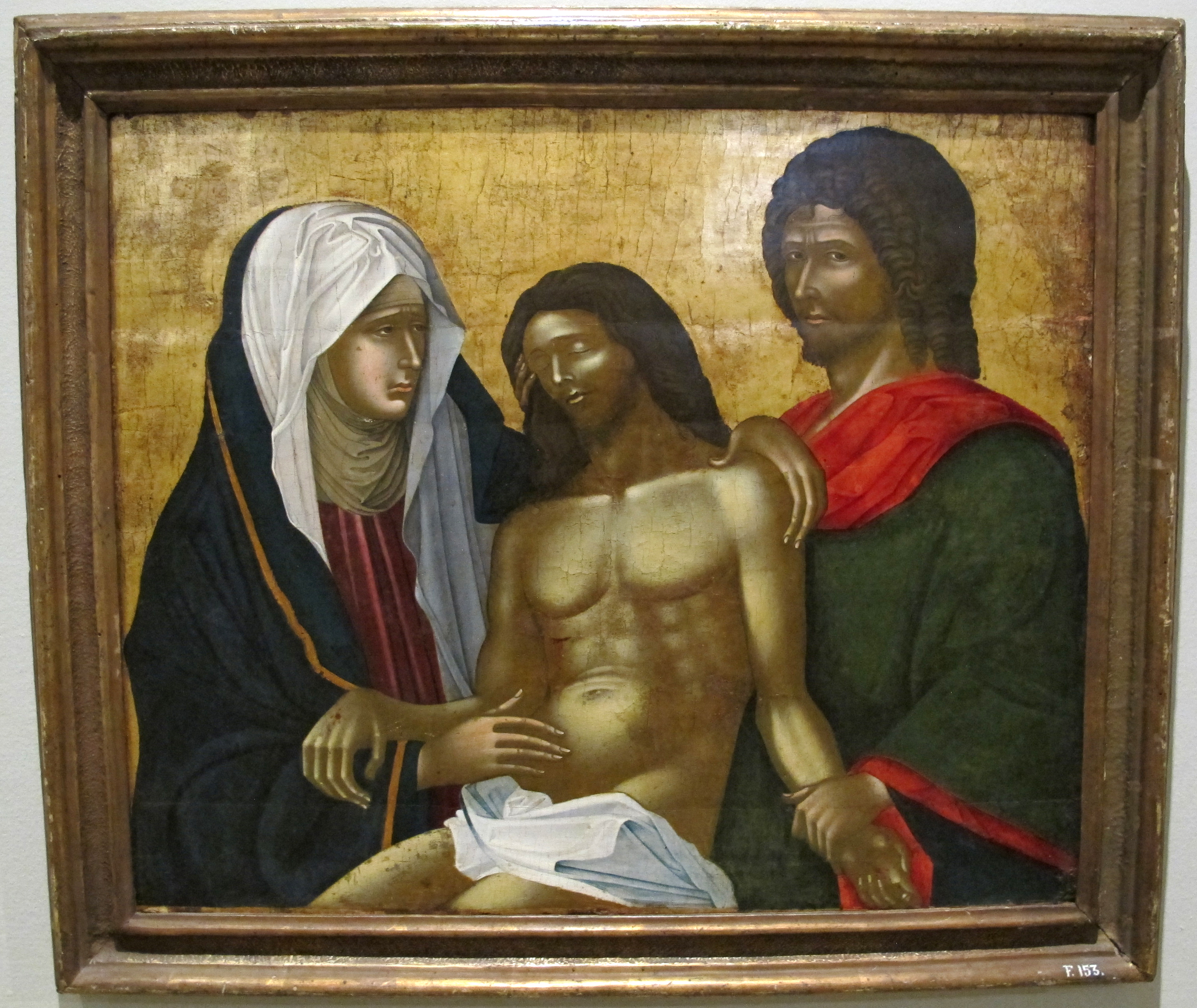
Pietà Tzafouris

== Bibliography ==
- Hatzidakis, Manolis (1987). Έλληνες Ζωγράφοι μετά την Άλωση (1450-1830). Τόμος 1: Αβέρκιος - Ιωσήφ [Greek Painters after the Fall of Constantinople (1450-1830). Volume 1: Averkios - Iosif]. Athens: Center for Modern Greek Studies, National Research Foundation. hdl:10442/14844. ISBN 960-7916-01-8.
- Hatzidakis, Manolis; Drakopoulou, Evgenia (1997). Έλληνες Ζωγράφοι μετά την Άλωση (1450–1830). Τόμος 2: Καβαλλάρος – Ψαθόπουλος [Greek Painters after the Fall of Constantinople (1450–1830). Volume 2: Kavallaros – Psathopoulos]. Athens: Center for Modern Greek Studies, National Research Foundation. hdl:10442/14088. ISBN 960-7916-00-X.
