= Angel Holding the Body of Christ =

Painting by Nikolaos Kallergis

- Άγγελος Που Κρατά το Σώμα του Χριστού (Greek), Angelo Che Tiene il Corpo di Cristo (Italian)
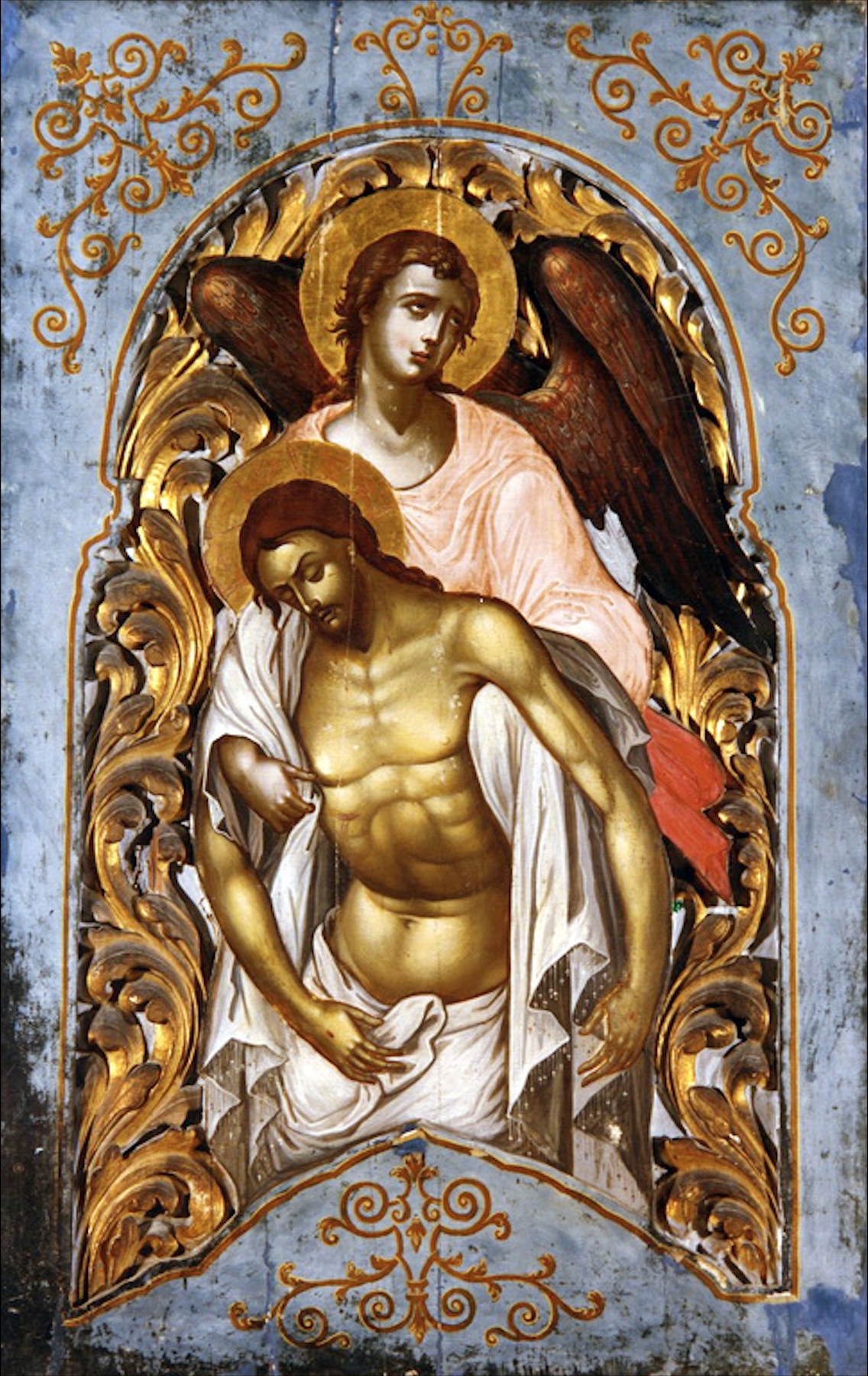
- Artist: Nikolaos Kallergis
- Year: 1732
- Medium: tempera on wood
- Movement: Heptanese School
- Subject: Sanctuary gate (royal doors) with a representation of an Angel who holds up the dead body of Christ
- Location: Zakynthos Museum, Zakynthos, Greece
- Owner: Zakynthos Museum

Angel Holding the Body of Christ was a work of art created by Greek painter Nikolaos Kallergis. Kallergis was born in Zakynthos. His family was originally from Crete. His father was a painter. Nikolaos was active from 1715–1747. He was a representative of the Heptanese school. His family owned a church on the island of Zakynthos and a massive library. The family was educated. According to the Institute of Neohellenic Research, thirty-two of his painting’s survived.

An integral part of the iconostasis are the royal doors. Sometimes the iconostasis can have three or more doors. The royal doors are closed during important parts of the service. The priest is the only individual allowed to enter the sacred doors. They lead to the sanctuary or holy table. The area behind the iconostasis is the secret place where the priest prepares the holy eucharist. The royal doors were remnants of the destroyed Church of Panagia Tsourouflis.

The theme Angel holding the body of Christ has been reproduced by countless Greek, Italian and Flemish painters. It is part of the passion sequence. Notable versions were completed by Flemish artists Bartholomeus Spranger and Jacob de Backer. Hendrick Goltzius was a notable Dutch engraver that adopted a version of Spranger's work. Venetian engraver Giuseppe Scolari also printed his own version of the theme. Kallergi's work is a mixture of the different works. Flemish engravings and paintings heavily influenced artists of the Heptanese school. Kallergis created several works emulating engravings. Kallergis produced several works representing the passion series.

Three similar parts of royal doors were completed by Kallergis. An angel carrying a column was painted on one of the doors. The column symbolized the pole Jesus was flogged on during the passion series. On another door, he painted an angel carrying whips. The whips symbolized the instruments used to whip Jesus before the crucifixion during the passion series. The third royal door contained the Angel Holding the Body of Christ. The Heptanese school continued to evolve since its inception during the middle part of the 17 century. The style adopted by Kallergis became an integral part of the artistic advancement of the period. Many artists of the Heptanese School painted similar works. The work is part of the collection of the Zakinthos Museum in Greece. Many of Kallergi's works are at this location.

== Description ==
The royal door was made of tempera paint and wood. The work of art features a superlative decorative motif reminiscent of the Rococo style. The angel's flesh tone compared to Jesus's distinguishes the two figures. The pale dead martyr's body rests in the arms of the sullen angel. The work of art is a mixture of Spranger and Backer's masterpieces. The artwork mostly resembles Hendrick Goltzius's engraving. The Heptanese school featured musculature and advanced anatomical interpretation in art. Many artists began to feature more refined subjects with more detail. The human body was realistically presented. Kallergis painted Jesus's biceps and triceps. His abdominal muscle was represented with careful detail. His work resembled realistic anatomical models. The holy shroud features striations to suggest folds of fabric. The artist employed an advanced light and shadow method. Both figures are statuesque. The poses of the figures suggest a grieving event wrought with sorrow and horror. The postures and gestures of both divine beings emit melancholy and sadness. The artist clearly pictorially relays the emotion of the grieving event. The angel gazes at the heavens awaiting instructions.

== Gallery ==
=== Notable works ===
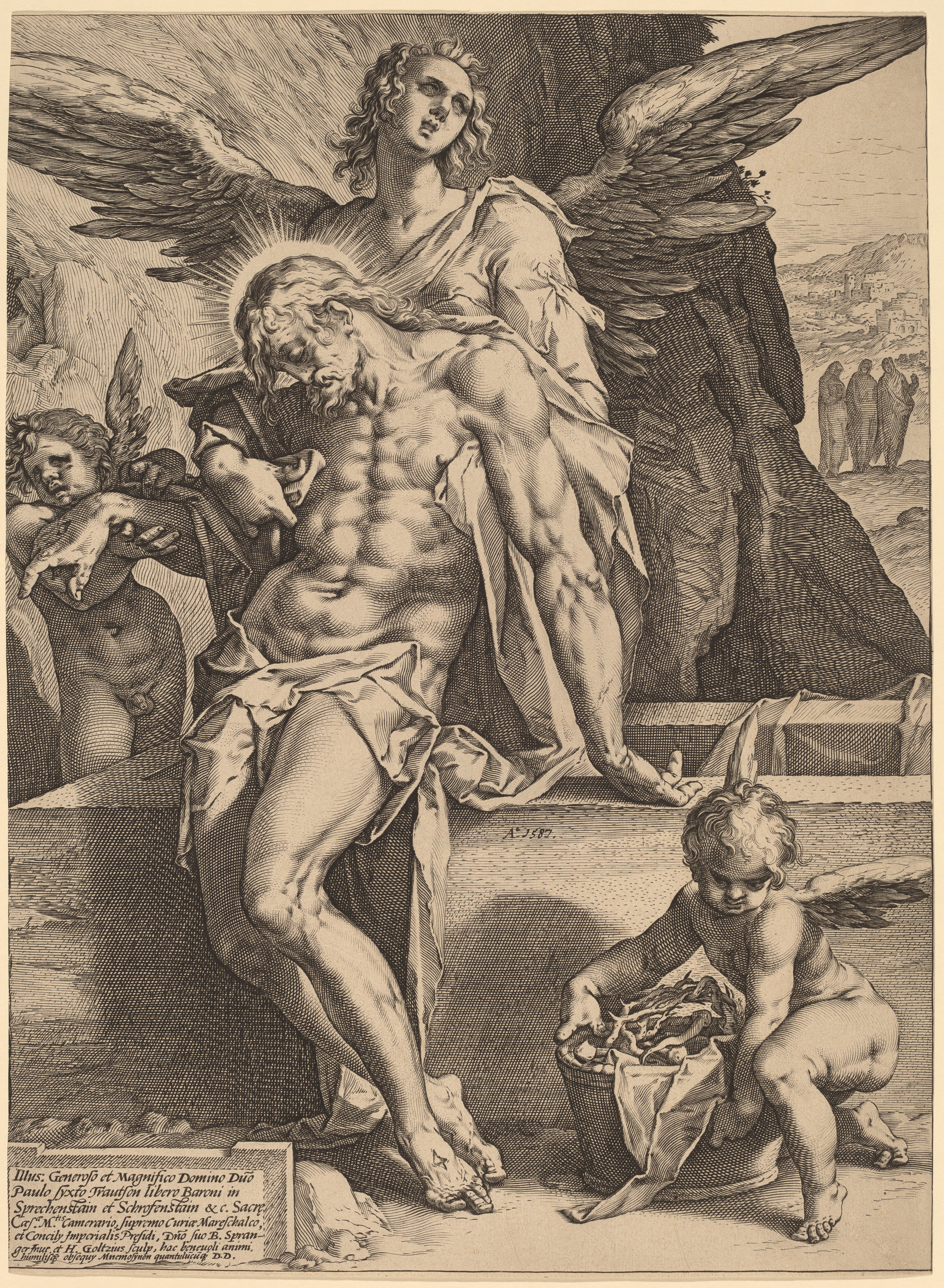
Dead Christ Supported by an Angel, Goltzius

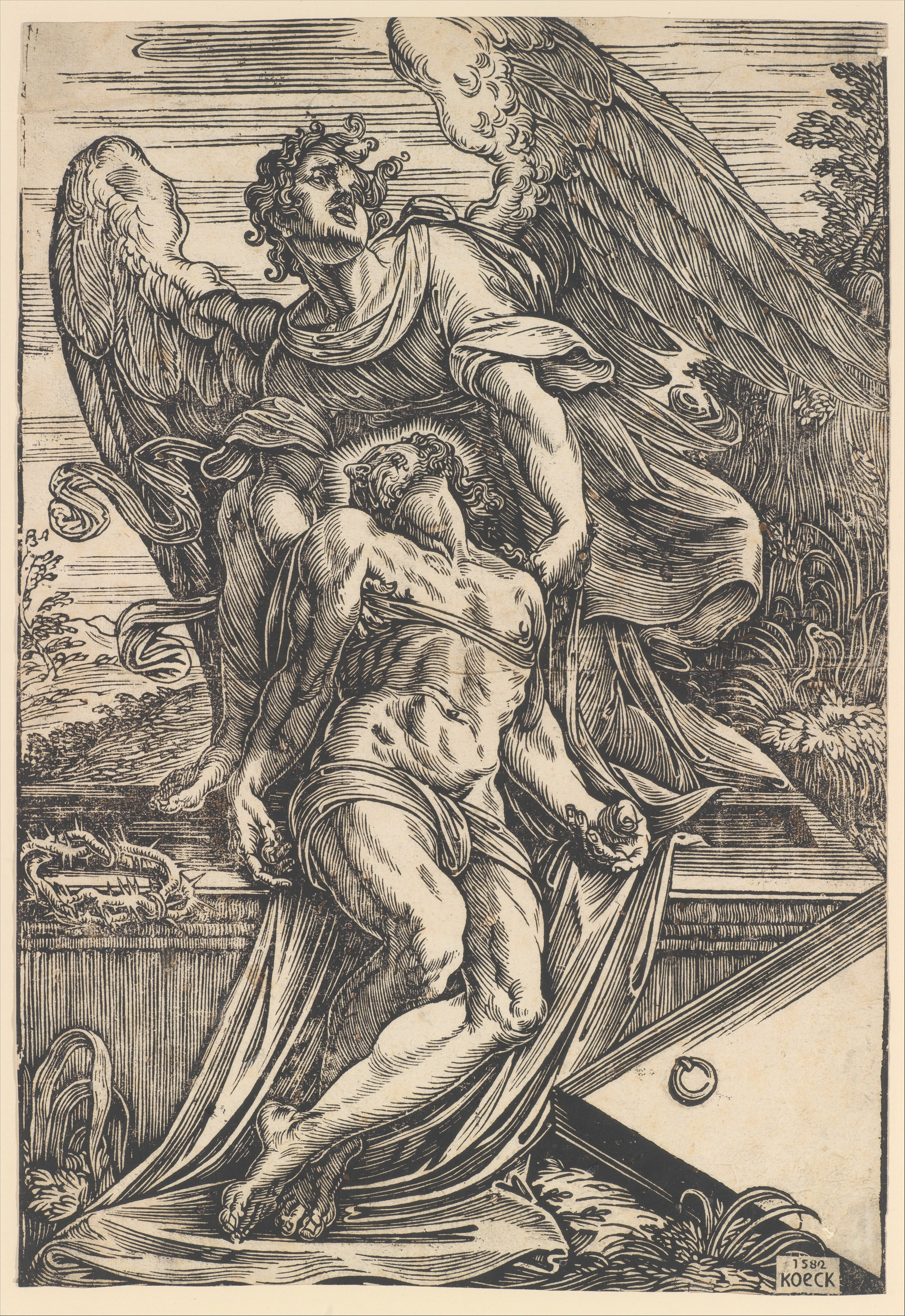
Dead Christ Supported by an Angel, Scolari

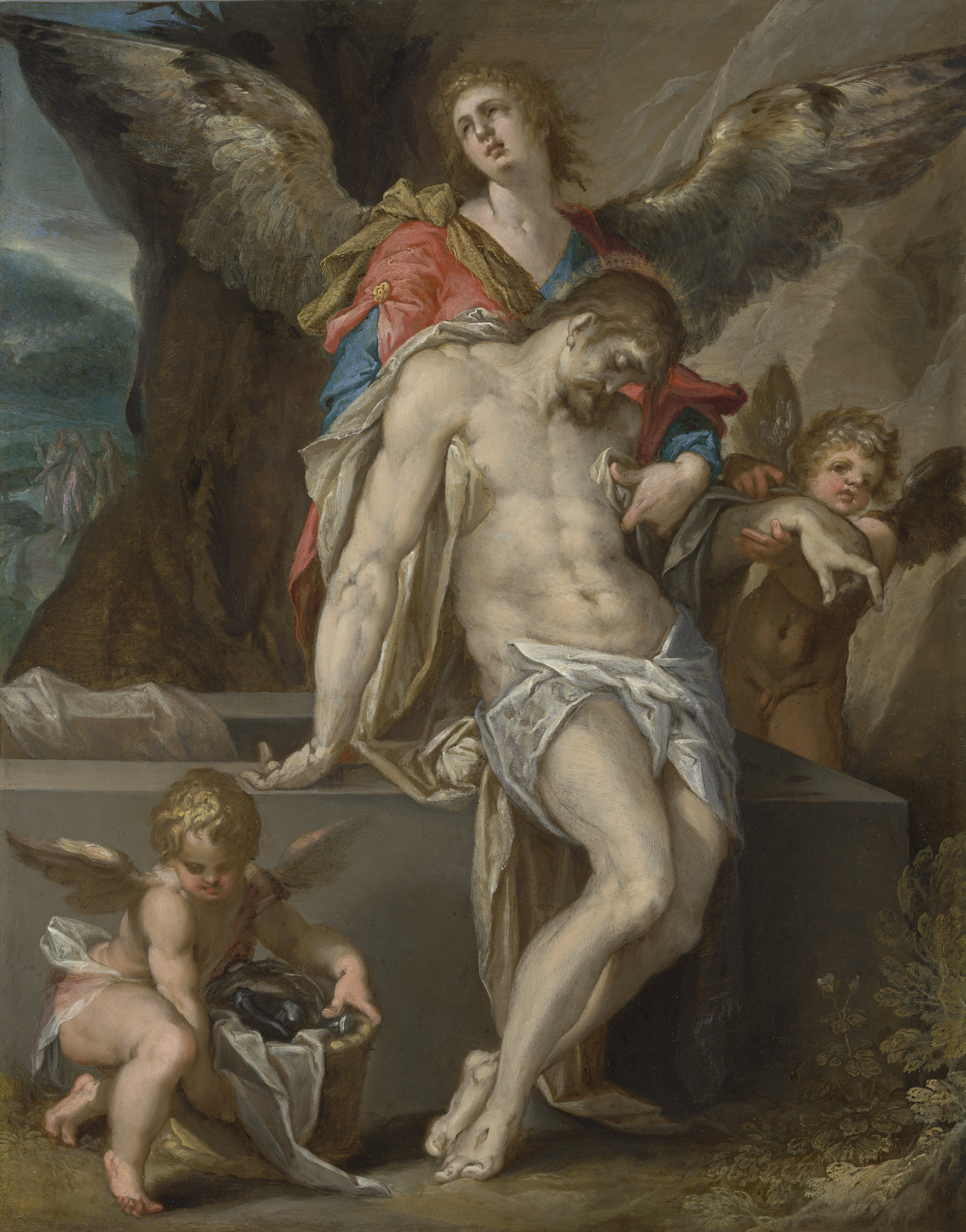
Dead Christ Supported by an Angel, Spranger

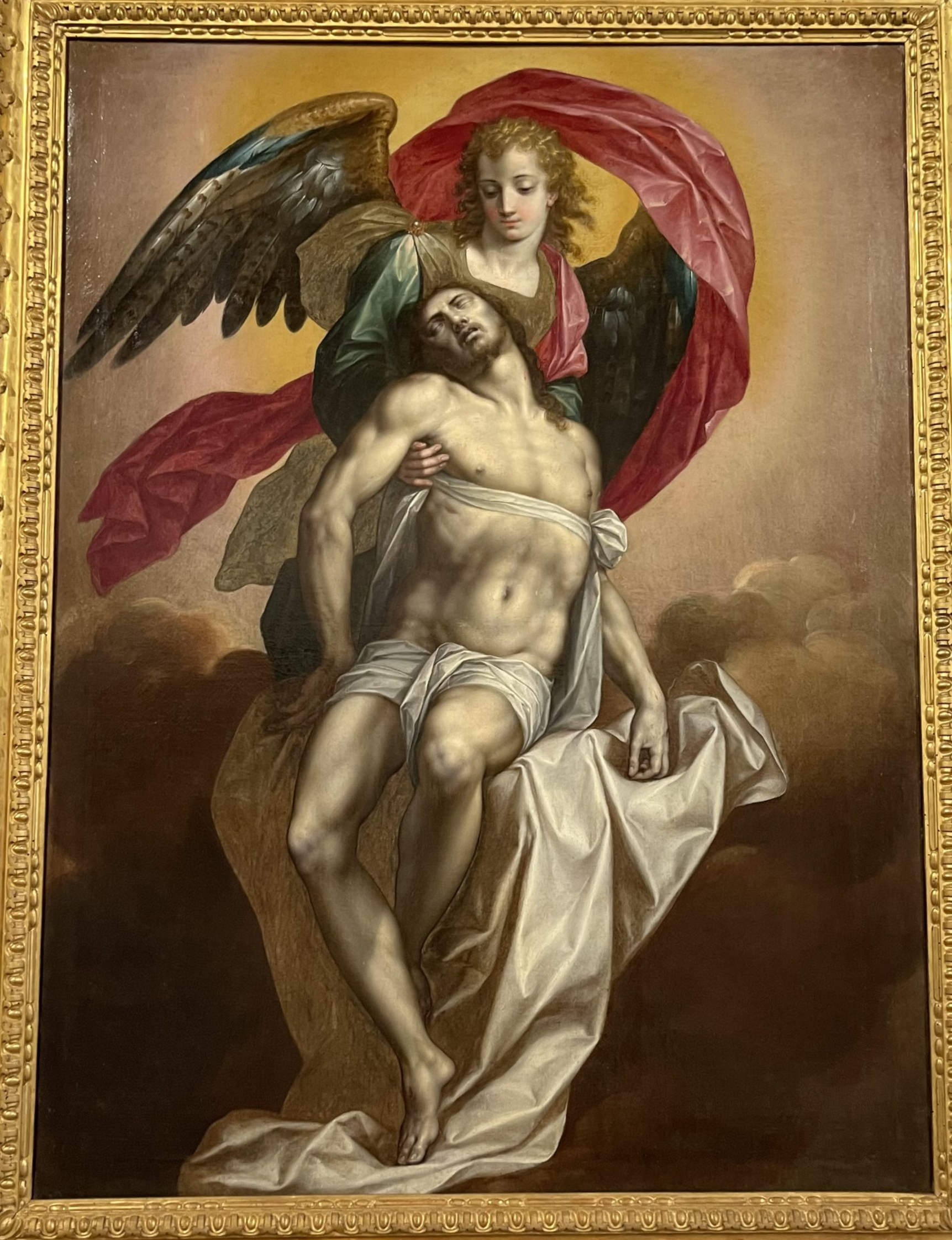
Angel Holding the Body of Christ, Backer

=== Royal Doors ===
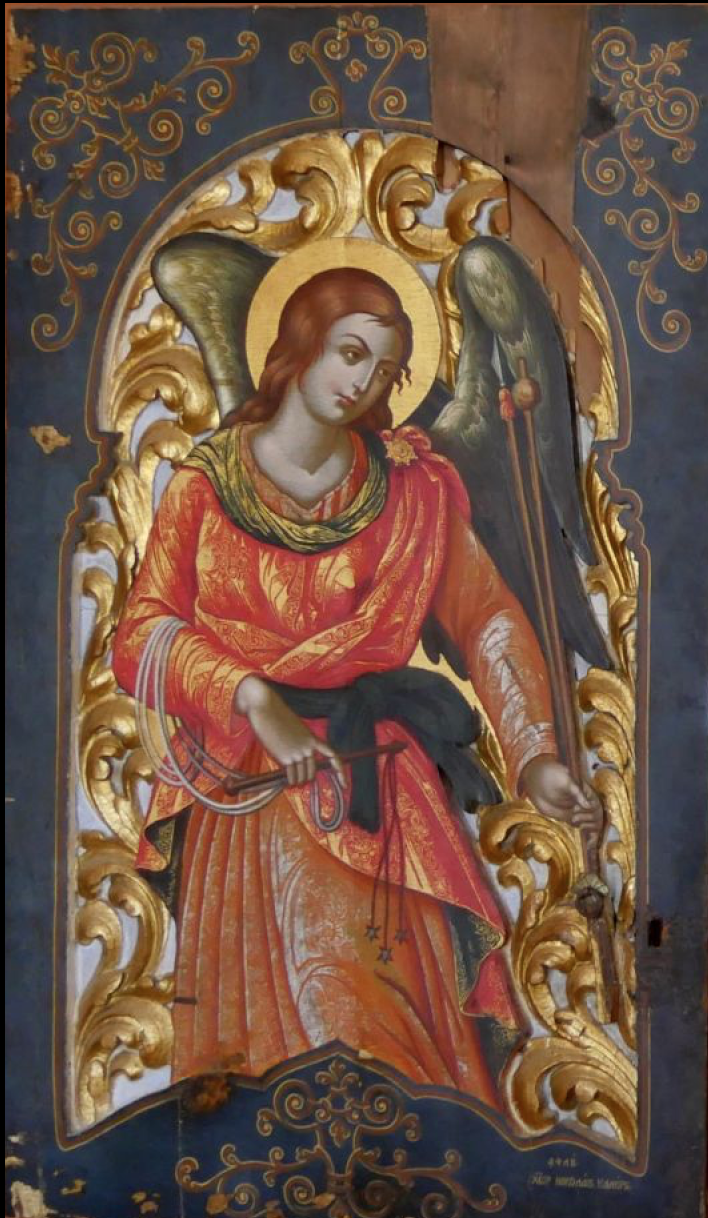
Angel Carry Symbol of Passion (Whip) Kallergis

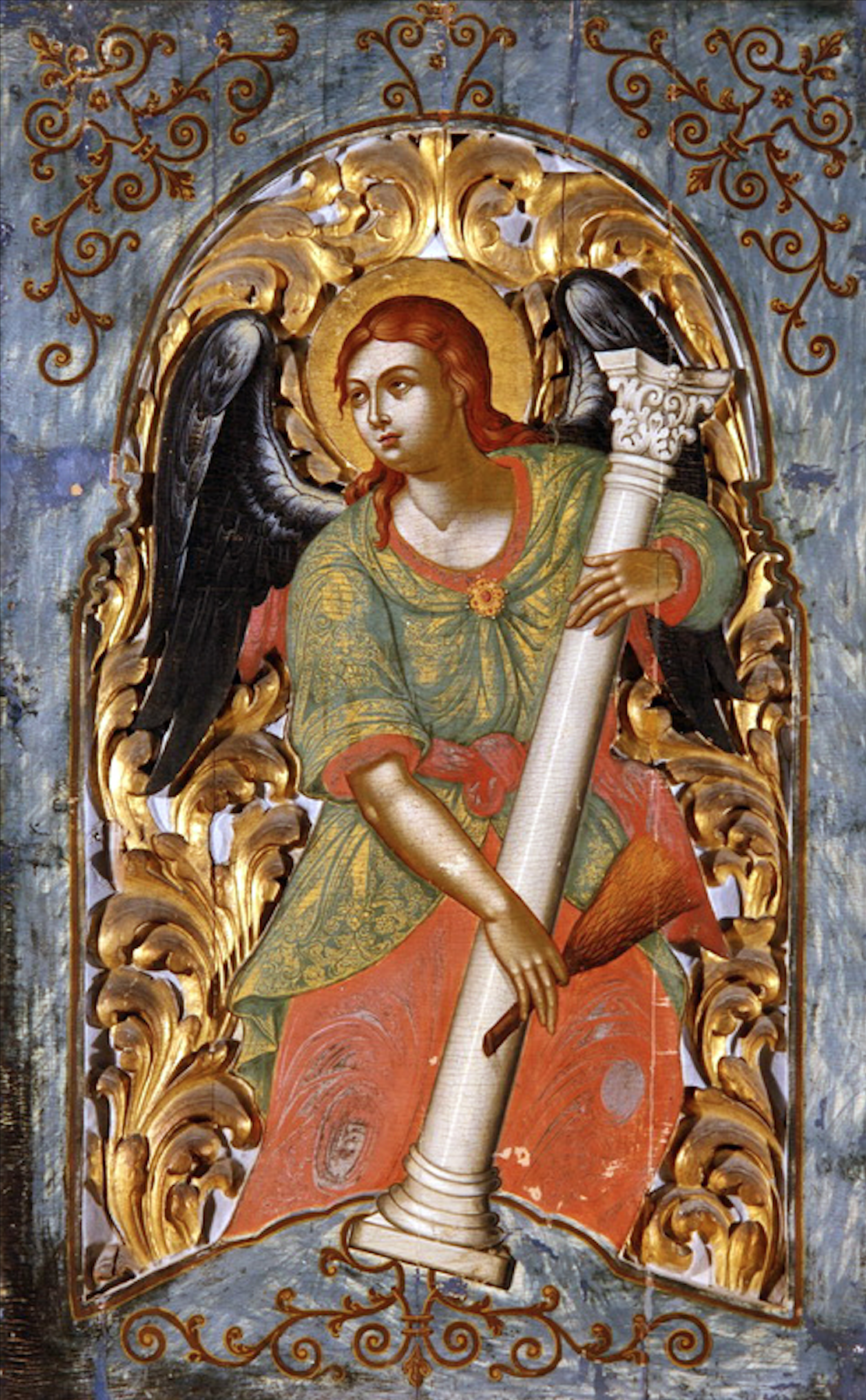
Angel Carry Symbol of Passion (Column) Kallergis

== Bibliography ==
- Hatzidakis, Manolis; Drakopoulou, Evgenia (1997). Έλληνες Ζωγράφοι μετά την Άλωση (1450–1830). Τόμος 2: Καβαλλάρος – Ψαθόπουλος [Greek Painters after the Fall of Constantinople (1450–1830). Volume 2: Kavallaros – Psathopoulos]. Athens: Center for Modern Greek Studies, National Research Foundation. hdl:10442/14088. ISBN 960-7916-00-X.
