= Dionysios Kallivokas =

Greek painter (1806–1877)

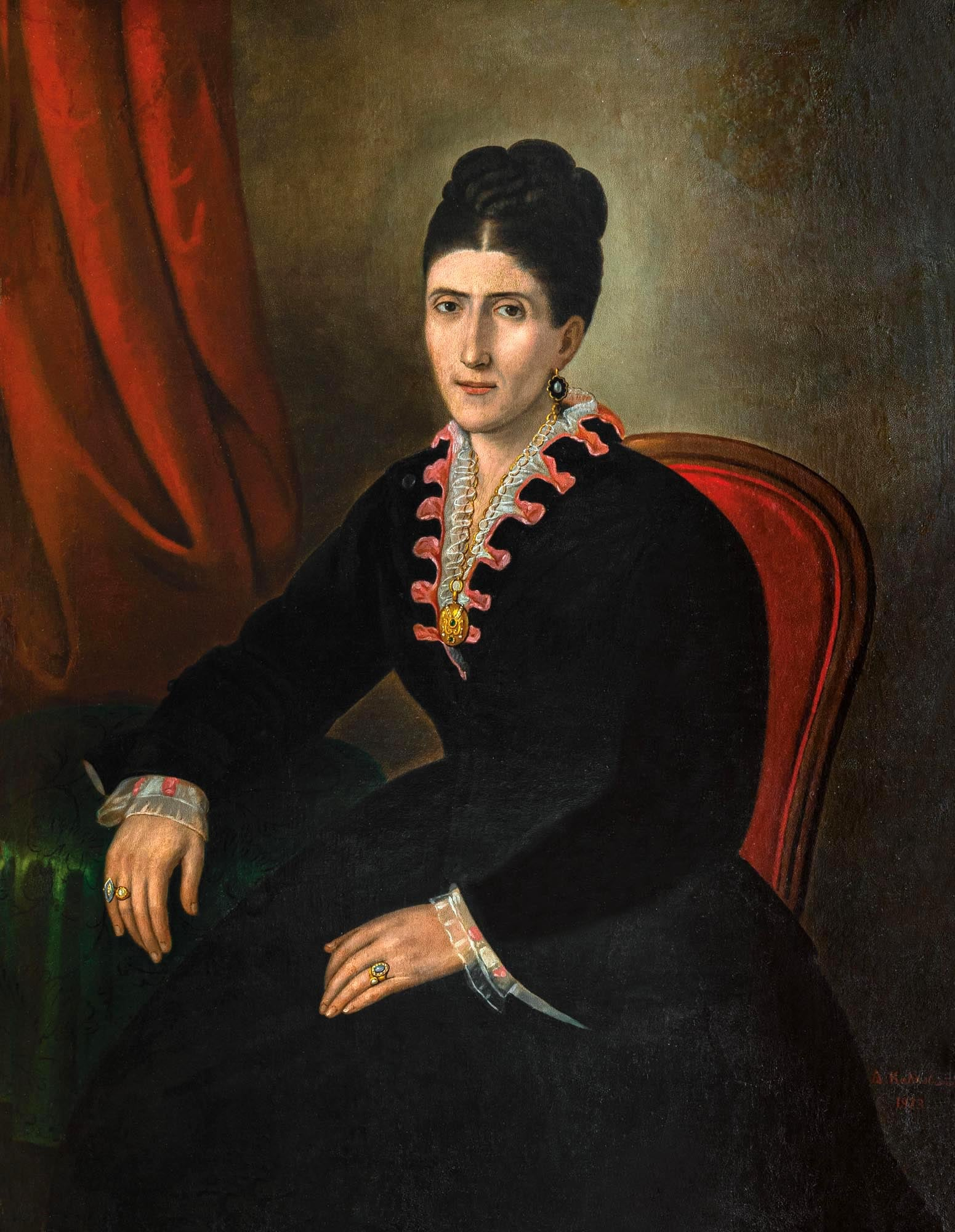
Portrait of an unidentified woman

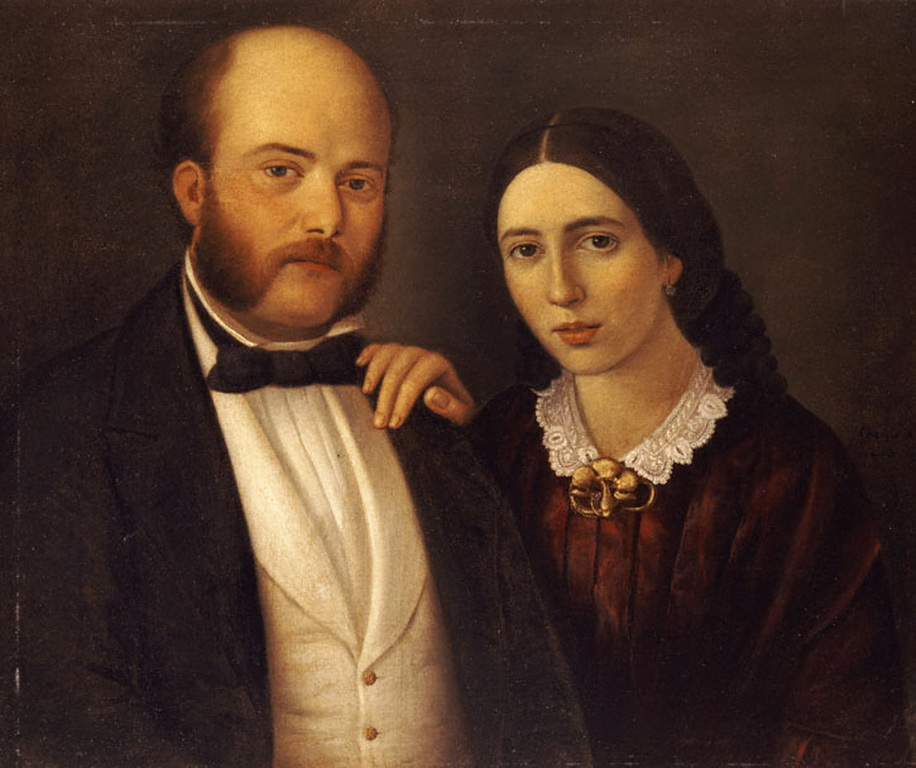
Portrait of a couple

Dionysios Kallivokas (Greek:Διονύσιος Καλλιβωκάς; 30 June 1806, Zakynthos – 15 May 1877, Athens) was a Greek portrait and icon painter; associated with the Heptanese school.

== Biography ==
Kallivokas was born in Zakynthos. The island was under Russian control but, the following year, it was taken by the French. He received his first art lessons from the icon painter, Nikolaos Kantounis, who was also an Orthodox priest. He continued his studies in Rome at the Accademia di San Luca, then at the Accademia di Belle Arti di Firenze with Tommaso Gazzarrini and Benedetto Servolini. He would remain in Florence for twelve years.

When he returned to Zakynthos, it had come under British control. He initially focused on icons and other religious art, then became a private teacher in Lefkada, followed by a position at the Ionian Academy. In 1864, the Ionian Islands were reunited with Greece. Three years later, took part in the Exposition Universelle in Paris. He was awarded a bronze medal for his copy of a painting by Anthony van Dyck, at the Olympia Exhibition in Athens (1870).

He relocated to Athens permanently in 1874, and supported himself by making copies of works by the Renaissance Masters. He quickly ran out of space, but when Nikiforos Lytras left for Germany, he gave Kallivokas his workshop. Financial success was slow in coming, so he began to show his works at the Athens City Hall. He was awarded a silver medal at the Panhellenic Exhibition of 1875.

Throughout his years in Athens, he maintained his ties to the Heptanese school. Most of his portraits were for a bourgeoise clientele. He died in 1877, aged seventy.

His works may be seen at the National Gallery, and at municipal galleries in Zakynthos, Lefkada, and Patras.
