= Ioannis Korais =

Greek painter

The Litany of Saint Charalambos
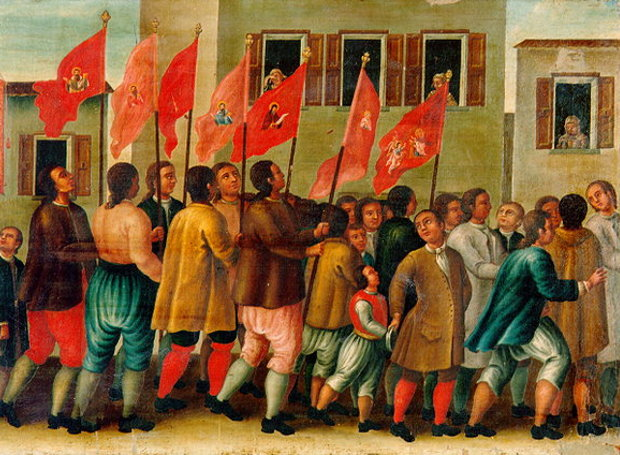
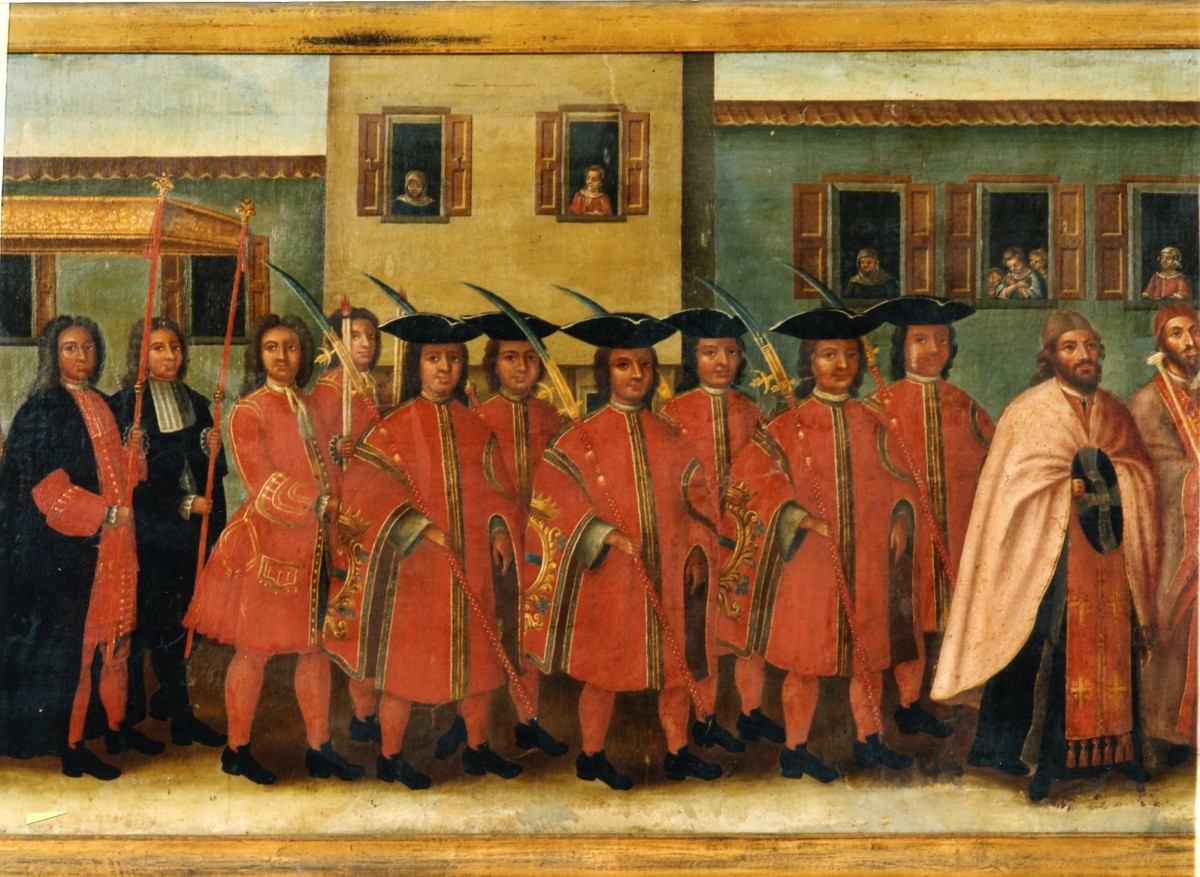

Ioannis Korais (Greek: Ιωάννης Κοραής, 1732 – December 10, 1799) was a Greek painter. He was a prominent member of the Heptanese School. His contemporaries were Nikolaos Doxaras and Nikolaos Koutouzis. His family was from the island of Chios. He was the grandson of the painter Michael Korais from Chios. He helped revolutionize Greek painting. He was a follower of Panagiotis Doxaras and the new techniques he was employing.

His student was the painter Nikolaos Kantounis. Korais was part of the Greek Rococo and Neoclassical movements in Greek art. His nephew of the same name, Ioannis Korais, was also a painter. His best known surviving work is the Litany of the Relic of Saint Charalambos, which is in the Zakynthos Museum.

== Biography ==
Korais was born in Zakynthos. The family originated from the Greek island of Chios. He was the grandson of painter Michael Korais. His nephew Ioannis Korais, his student, was born in 1781. When Ioannis Korais the elder died he left his nephew his tools for painting. He also taught the painter Nikolaos Kantounis. Records exist from the archives of the Agios Charalambos church in Zakynthos. He began his most notable work, The Litany of the Relic of Saint Charalambos in 1752, and finished the project after four years, in 1756. The work is 60 cm or 2 feet high and 7.6 meters or 24 feet long.

In 1772, a record exists that he was actively communicating with the Greek painter Nikolaos Koutouzis, who was in Corfu at the time. On September 26, 1796, Korais wrote a will leaving his nephew his house, art collection, paints, frames, brushes, canvases, and anything associated with his artistic workshop. He died three years later on December 10, 1799. In 1953, some of his paintings were lost in a fire, which burned the ruined churches of Agios Stefanos and Agios Vassilios in Zakynthos. Three of his works survive today. Apart from the Litany of the Relic of Saint Charalambos, the two other works are the Birth of Christ and the Resurrection of Christ; all of them are in the Zakynthos Museum.

== Bibliography ==
- Hatzidakis, Manolis (1987). Greek painters after the fall (1450-1830) Volume A. Athens, GR: Center for Modern Greek Studies E.I.E.
- Hatzidakis, Manolis & Drakopoulou, Eugenia (1997). Greek painters after the fall (1450-1830) Volume B. Athens, GR: Center for Modern Greek Studies E.I.E.
- Drakopoulou, Eugenia (2010). Greek painters after the fall (1450-1830) Volume C. Athens, GR: Center for Modern Greek Studies E.I.E.
