= Nikolaos Kantounis =

Greek priest, painter and teacher (1767–1834)

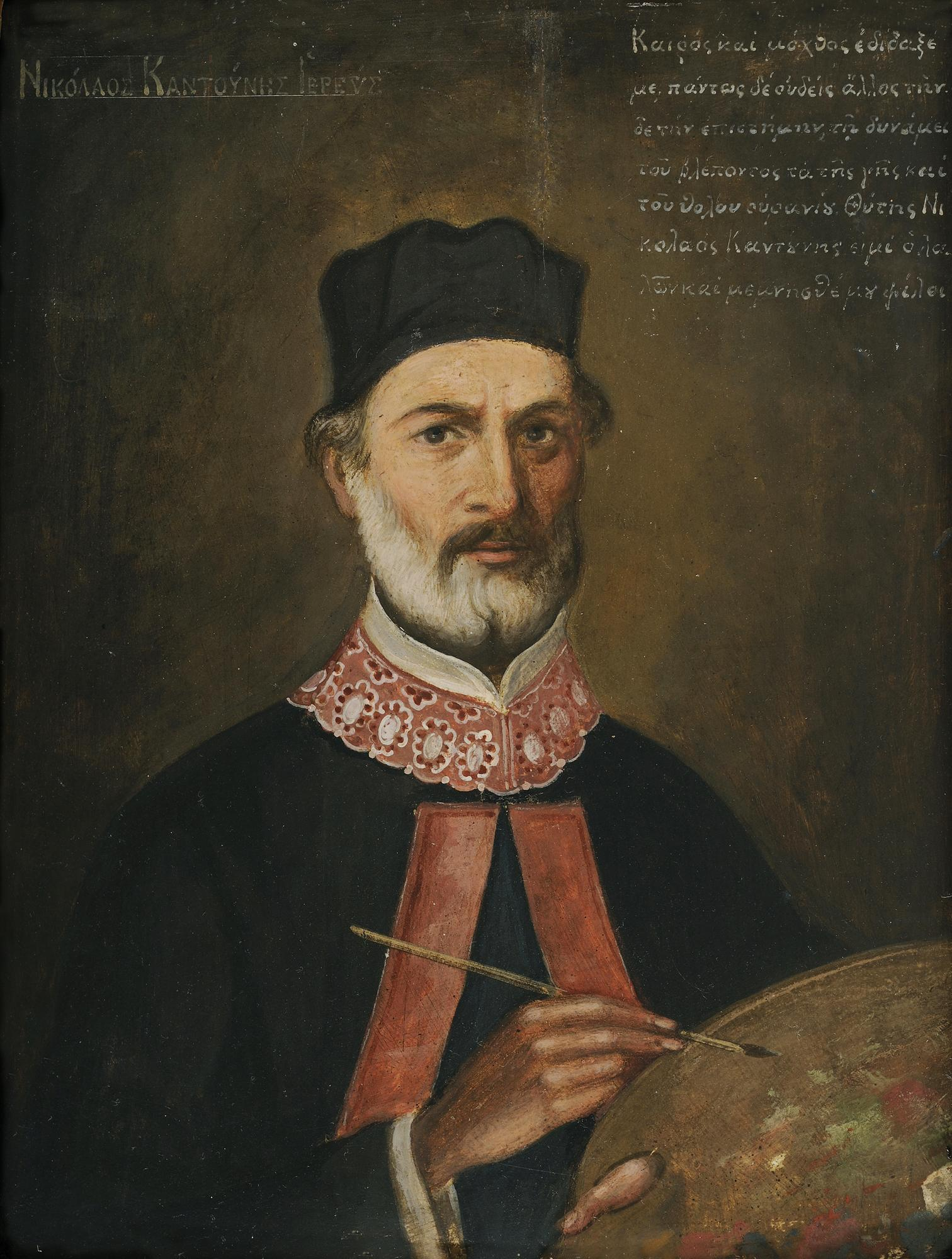
- Self-portrait (date unknown)
- Born: 1767; Zakynthos
- Died: 1834 (aged 66–67); Zakynthos
- Known for: Assumption; Descent from the Cross
- Movement: Greek Romanticism; Neoclassicism; Neo Hellenikos Diafotismos; Modern Greek art

Nikolaos Kantounis or Kandounis (Greek: Νικόλαος Καντούνης; 1767–1834) was a Greek priest, painter and teacher who did not follow the traditional Maniera Greca. His teacher was the famous painter Nikolaos Koutouzis. He began to incorporate the Maniera Italiana into the Heptanese School. Kantounis, Panagiotis Doxaras, Nikolaos Doxaras and Koutouzis were all prolific members of that school. Kantounis was one of the most important painters in the Neoclassical Period in Greece. He was a representative of the middle to late Modern Greek Enlightenment in Greek art. Over 164 of his paintings have survived. He is known for painting many portraits. Some of his works resemble the style of Nikolaos Doxaras. He was also a member of the secret organization for Greek Independence called the Filiki Eteria.

== Biography ==
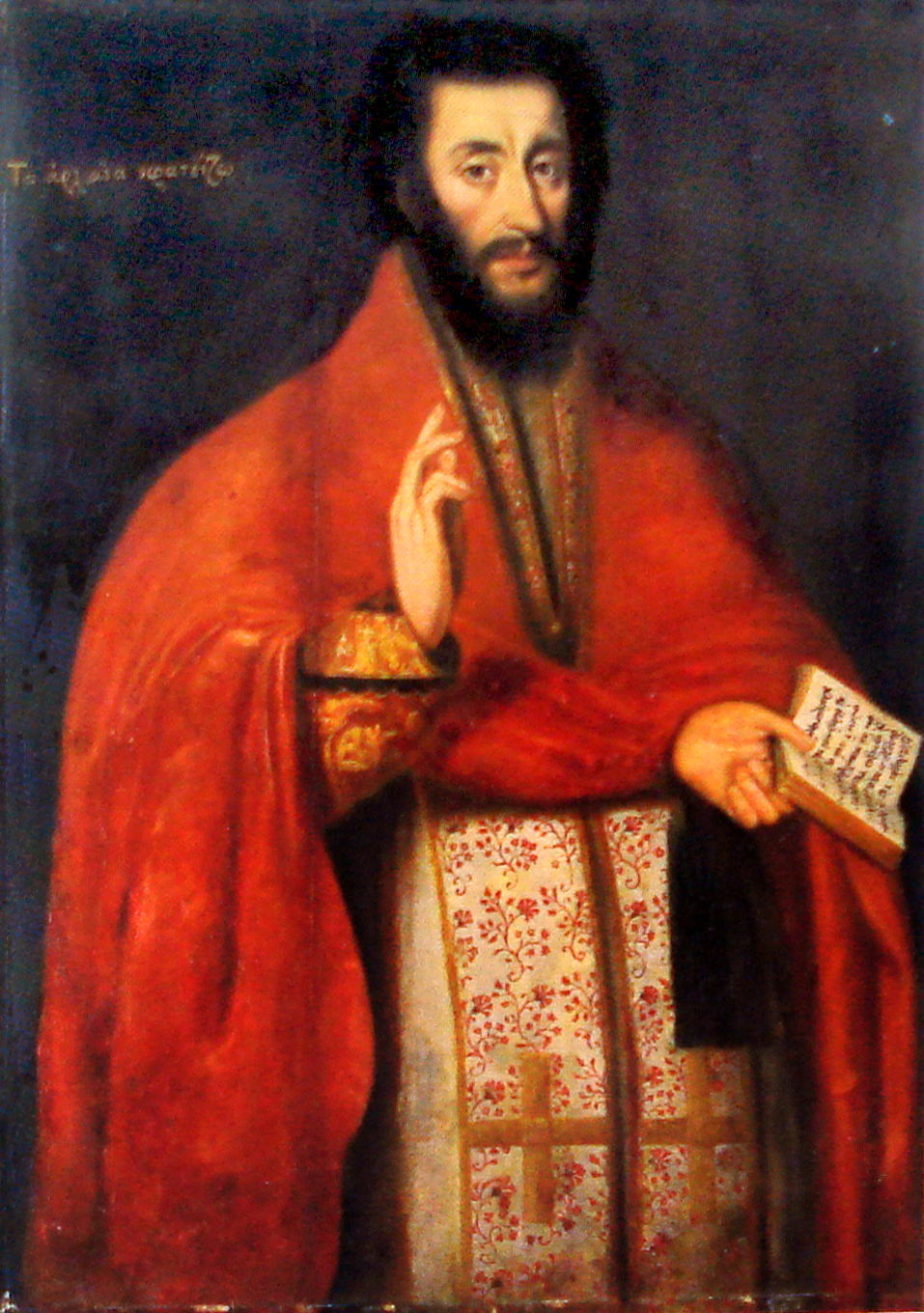
Greek Priest (late 18th century)

He was born in Zakynthos to a very wealthy and educated family. Records indicate Nikolaos was baptized on January 28, 1768. His father, Ioannis, was a doctor and a famous poet. His first teacher was the Greek poet Antonios Martelaos.

The Greek painter, Ioannis Korais, provided his first art lessons. He also worked in the studios of Nikolaos Koutouzis, who is rumored to have expelled him out of jealousy. He would later claim to be largely self-taught. His style was influenced by both Panagiotis Doxaras and Nikolaos Doxaras.

In 1786, he was ordained a priest and took a position at the church of Evangelistria in Zakynthos. By 1803, he had been hired by the executive committee of Agia Paraskevi church in Zakynthos to paint 12 icons depicting theological stories. Many of his church decorations have been destroyed by earthquakes.

He was a member of the secret Greek society Filiki Eteria (Society of Friends); a group dedicated to overthrowing Ottoman rule. In 1821, he was exiled by the British because of his subversive activities. They sent him to the island of Kyra, near Cephalonia. While he was there he painted a version of the Last Supper. He was not able to return home until after the recognition of Greek Independence in 1832.

In 1823, he was honored with the rank of Grand Sakellarios and, in 1825, he was mentioned in the codex of Saint Catherine of Siena in Zakynthos. Records indicate he was paid 100 thalers to create paintings for the church.

He died on April 25, 1834. He was about 66 years old and left a detailed will, which had interesting information about his life and property. Some of his students were the famous Greek painters Gerasimos Pitsamanos, Dionysios Tsokos and Dionysios Kallivokas. He was one of the earliest members of the modern Greek art period.

Kantounis paintings can be found at the National Gallery of Greece, the Benaki Museum, the Municipal Gallery of Larissa, the Teloglion Foundation of Arts etc.

== Gallery ==
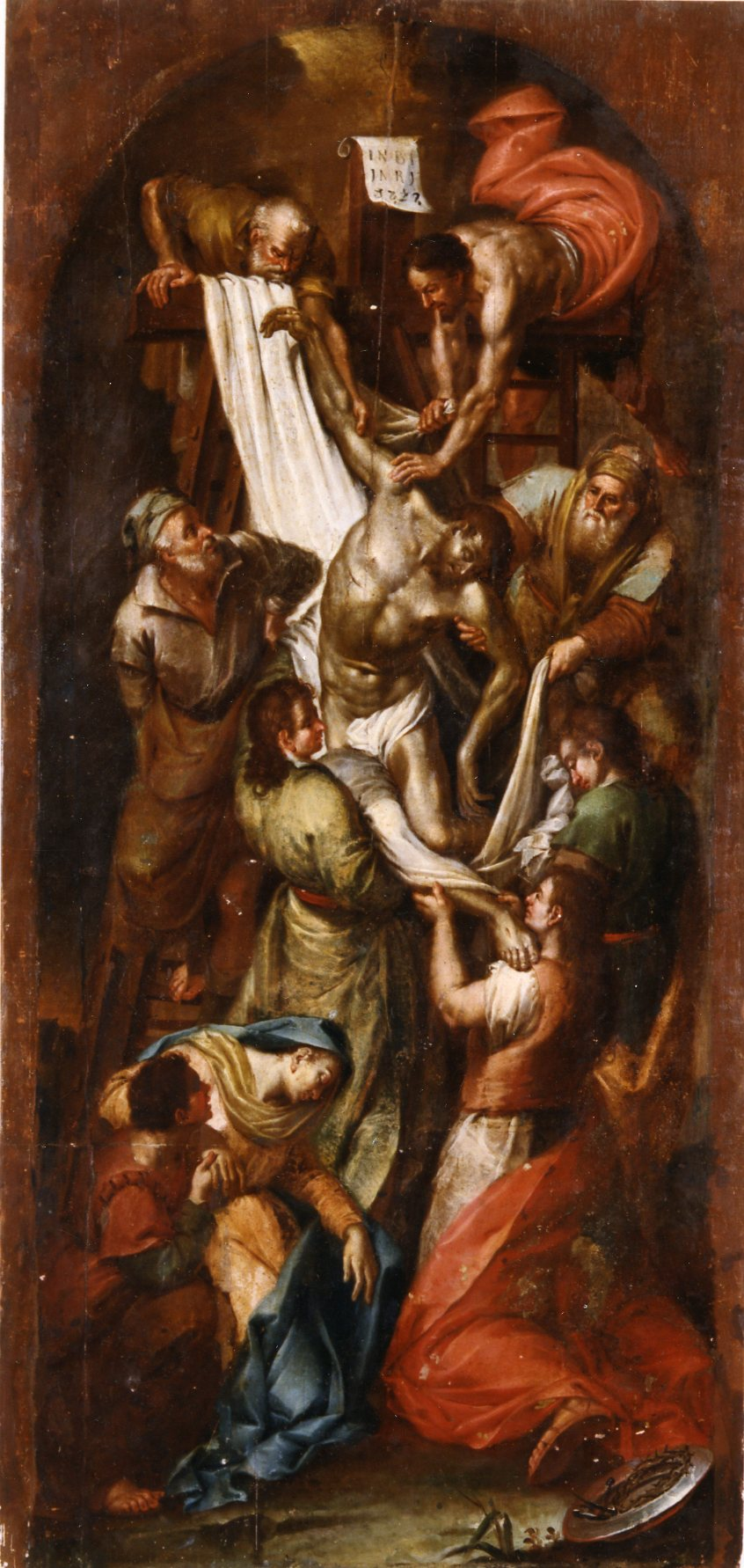
Christ Removed From Cross

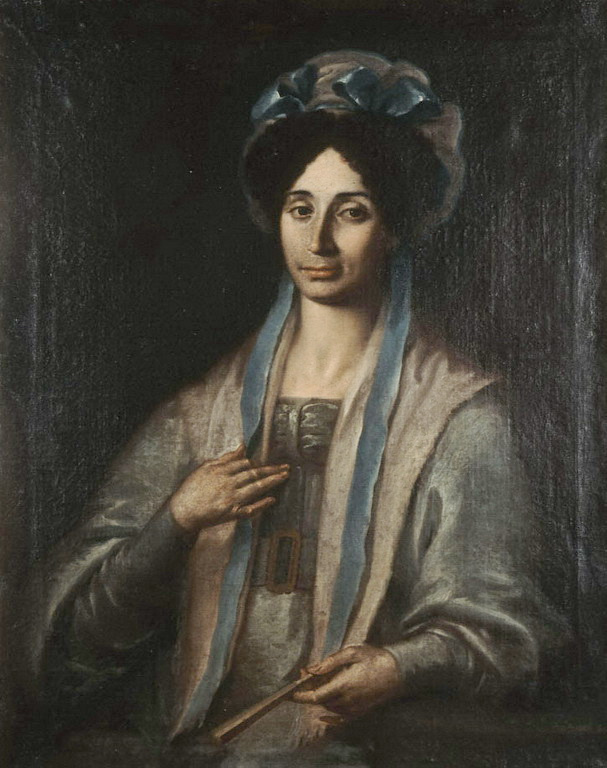
Portrait of Greek writer Elizabeth Moutzan-Martinegou

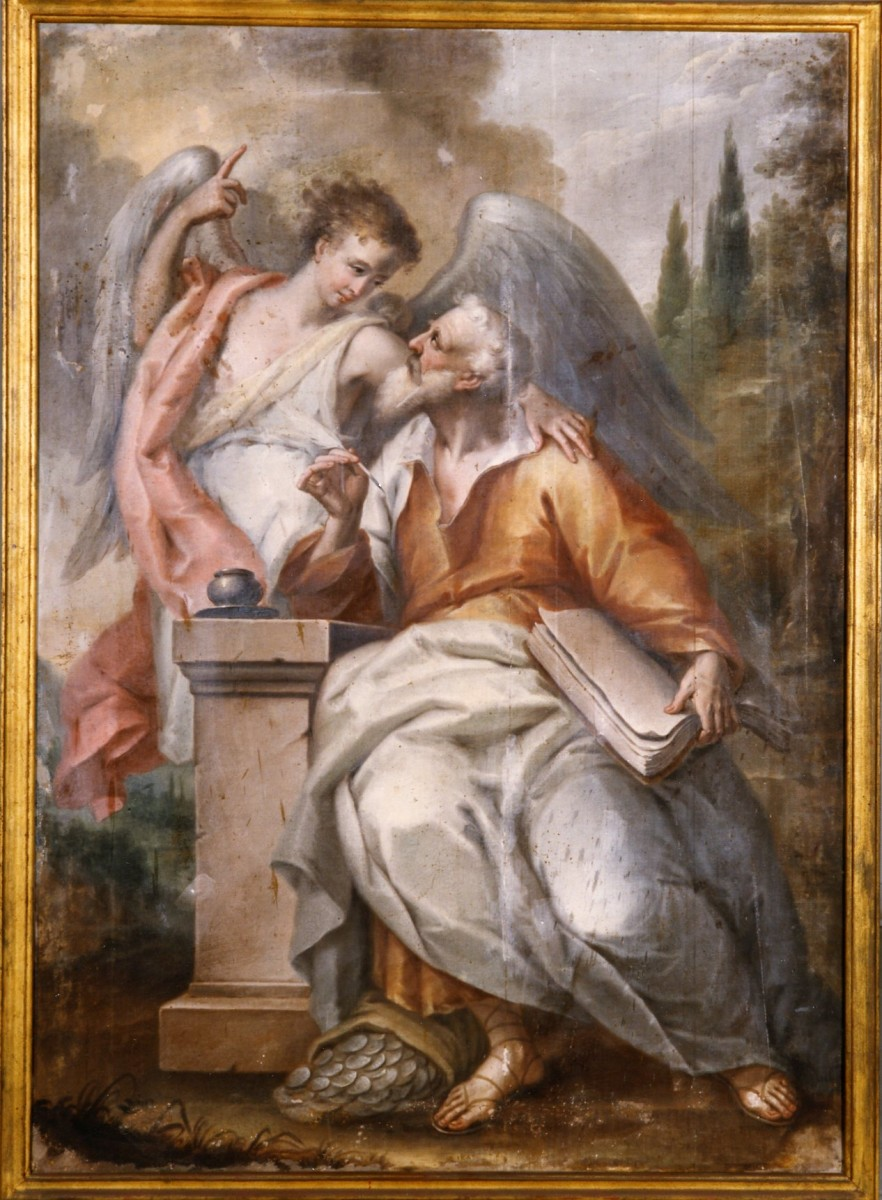
The Evangelist Matthew

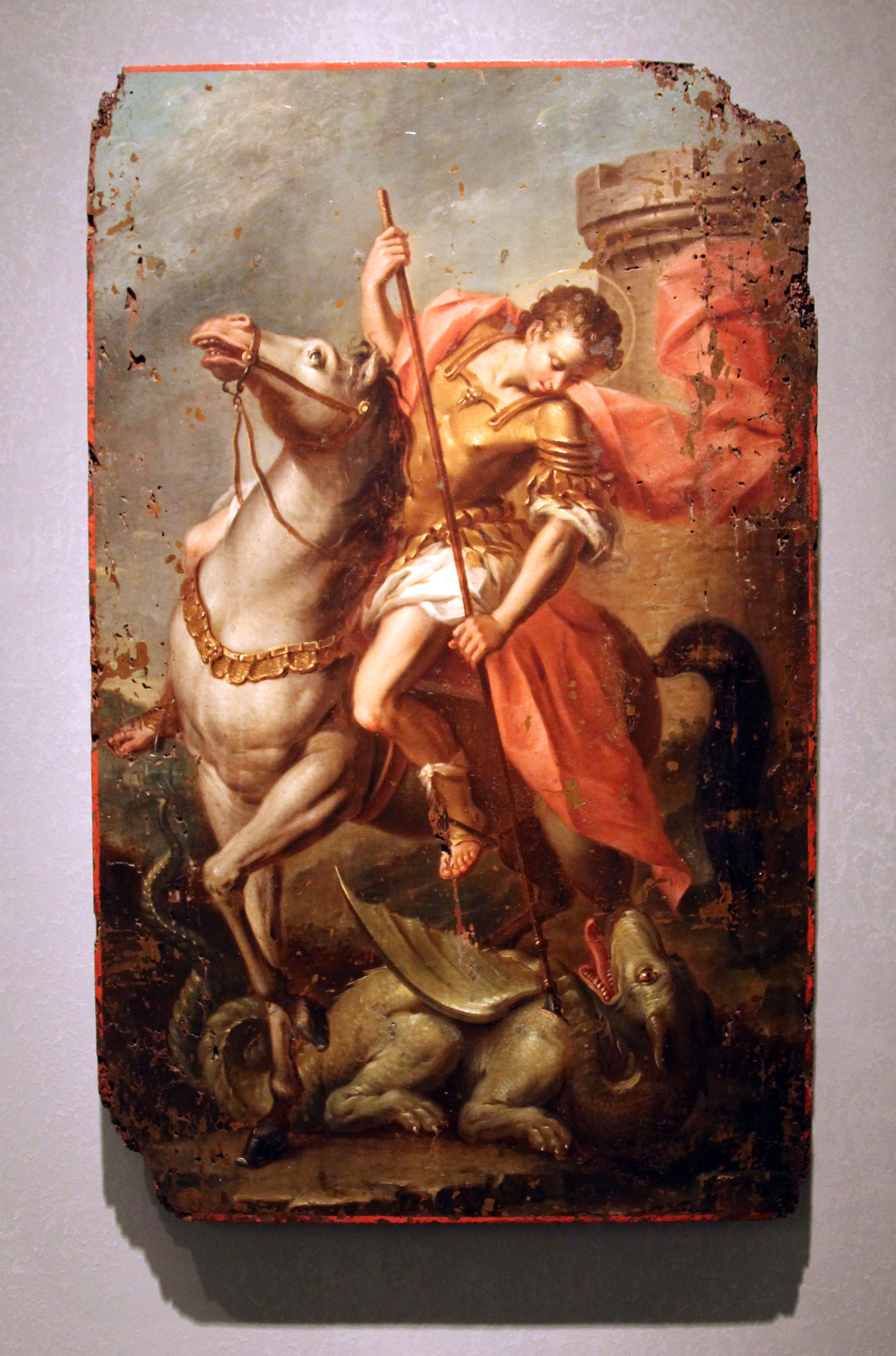
Saint George the Dragon-Slayer

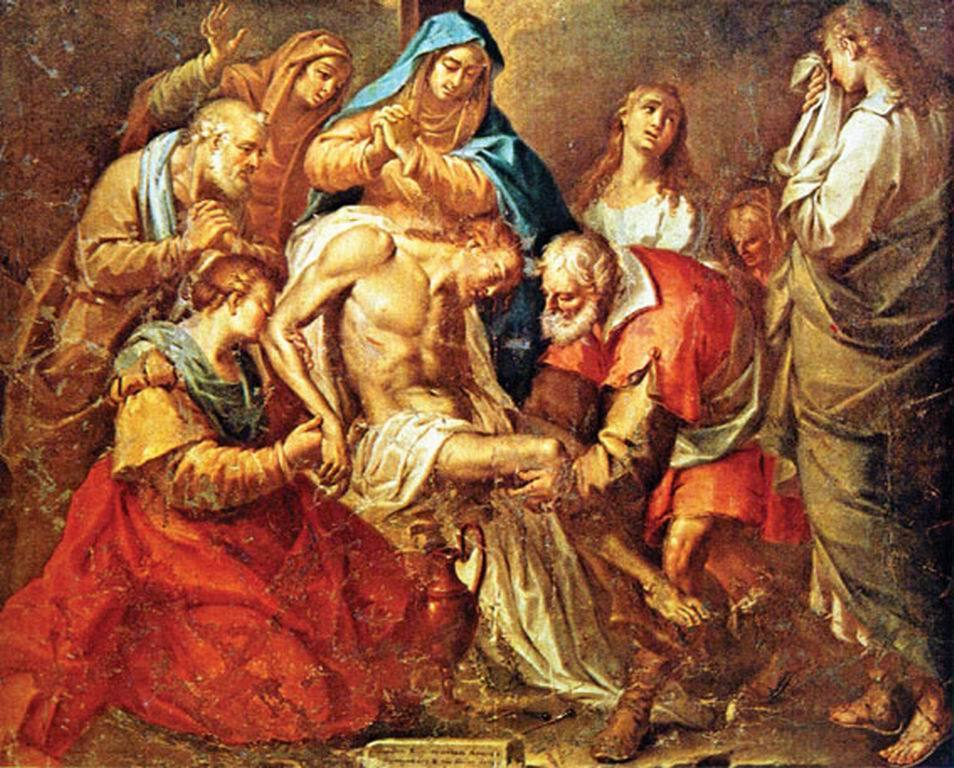
Descent from the Cross

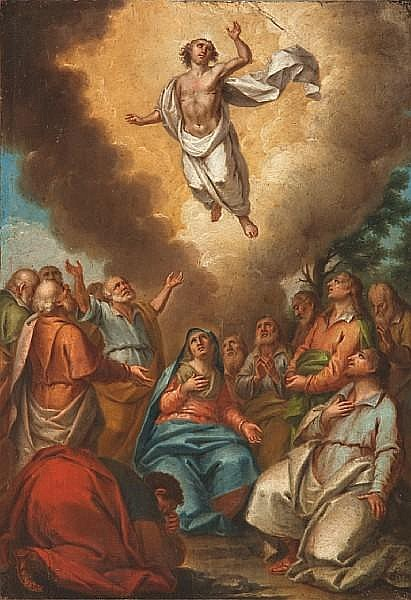
Ascension of Jesus

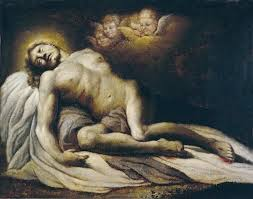
Descent from the Cross

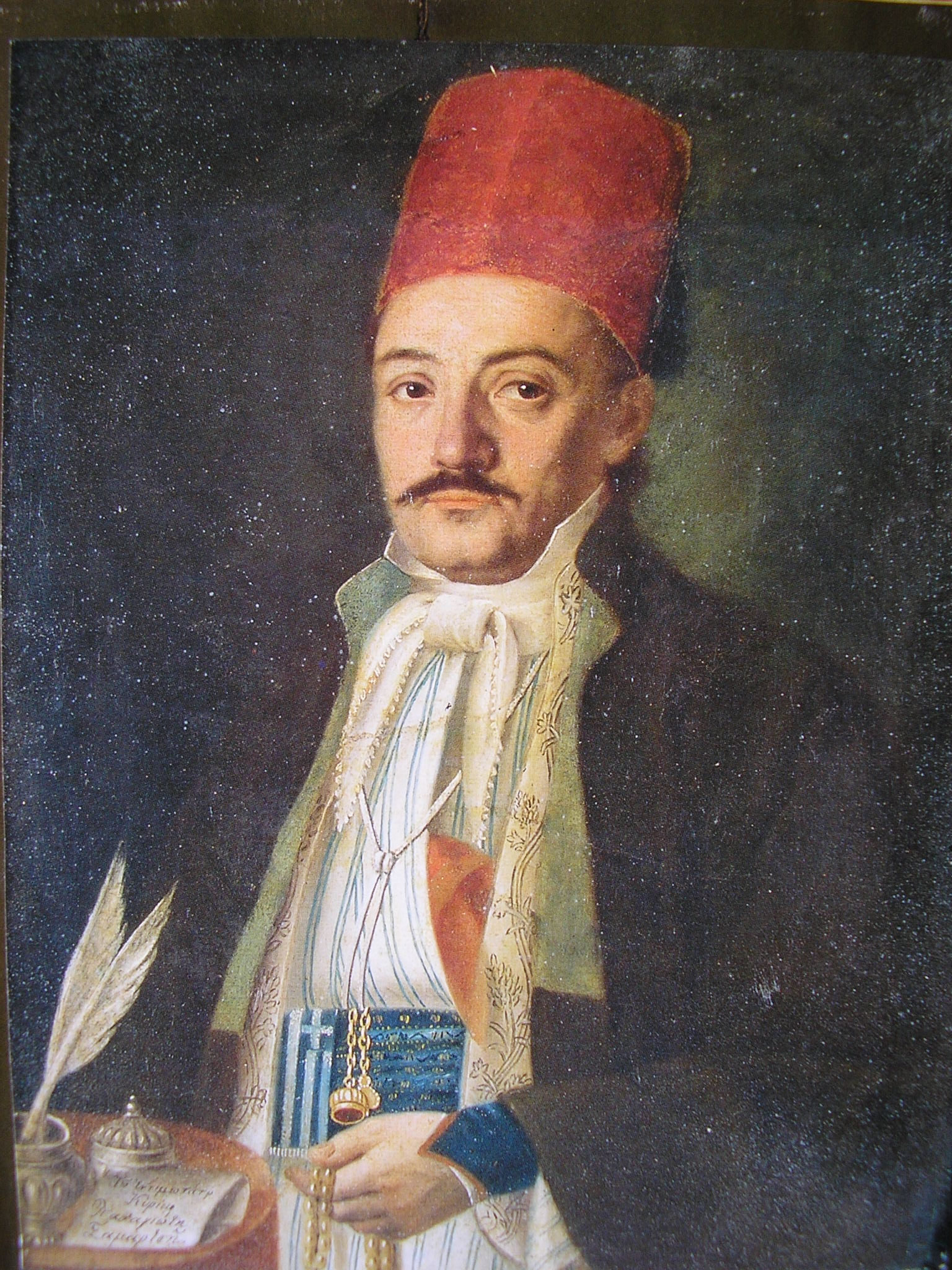
Panagiotis Samartzis (Historian)

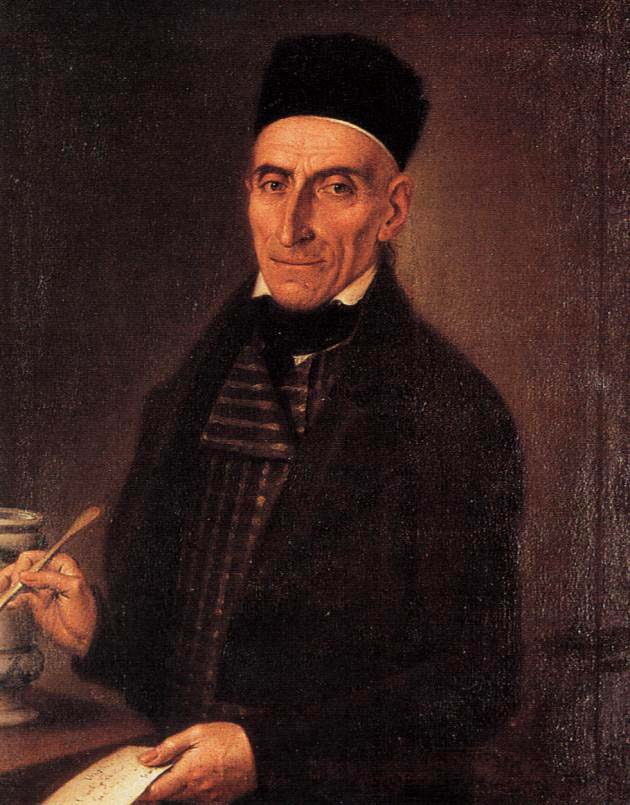
Chemist Nikopoulos

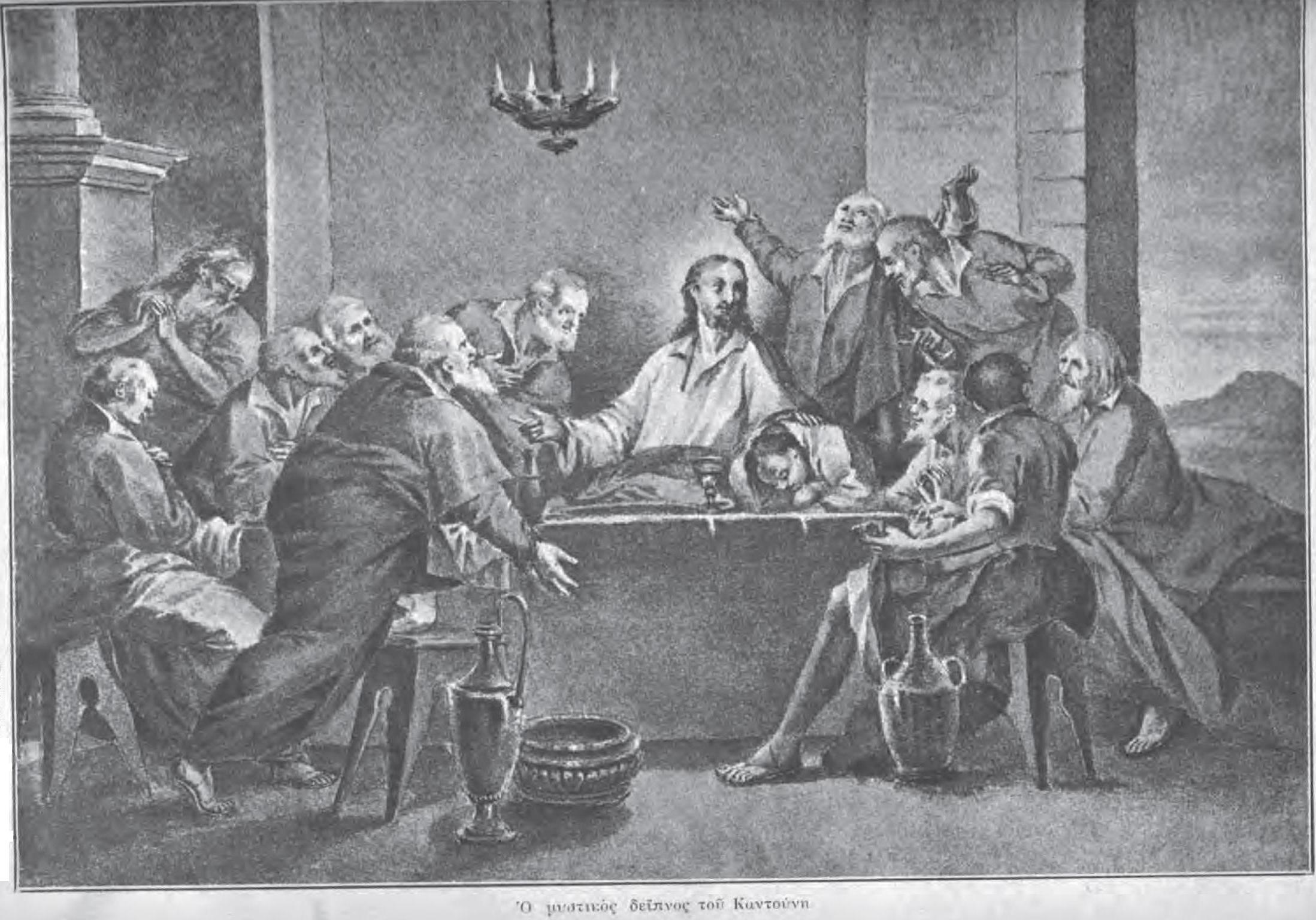
The Last Supper

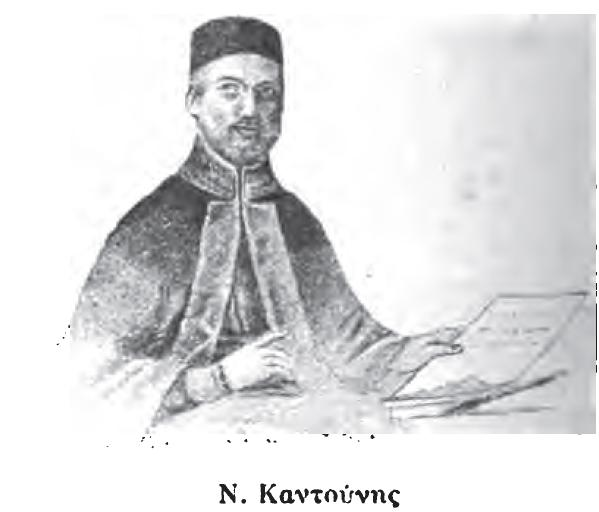
Priest

== Notable works ==
- Elisabeth Moutzan-Martinegko, ca 1832 National Gallery of Athens
- Lamentation of Christ (Kantounis)

== See also ==
- Andrea Mantegna
