= The Dormition of the Virgin (Ritzos) =

Painting by Andreas Ritzos

- Η Κοίμηση της Θεοτόκου (Greek), Dormizione di Maria (Italian)
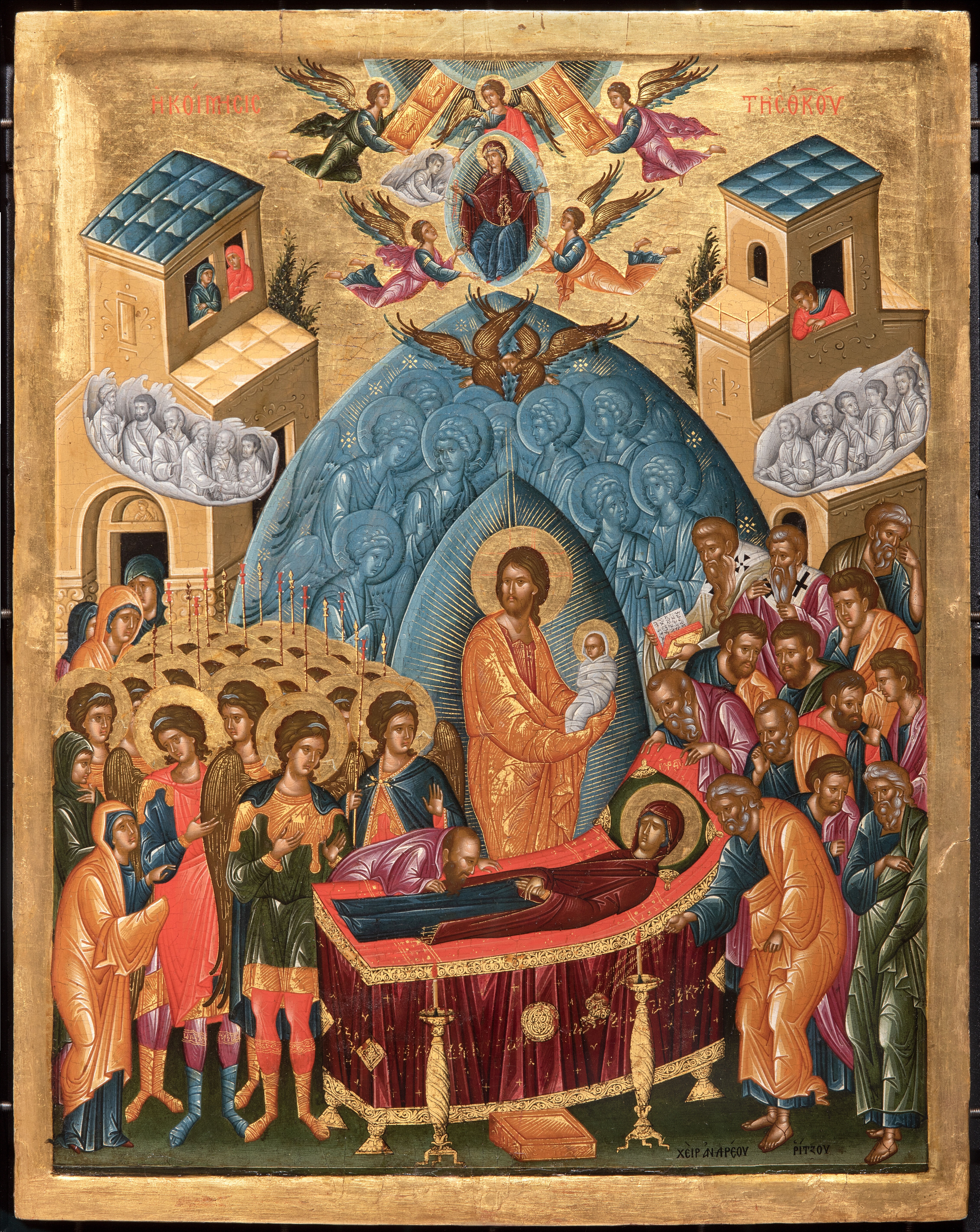
- Artist: Andreas Ritzos
- Year: 1436 - 1492
- Medium: tempera on wood
- Movement: Cretan School
- Subject: The Dormition of the Mary
- Dimensions: 56 cm × 44 cm (22 in × 17.3 in)
- Location: Galleria Sabauda, Turin, Italy
- Owner: Galleria Sabauda

The Dormition of the Virgin is a tempera painting by Andreas Ritzos. Ritzos was a Greek painter active on the island of Crete who flourished from 1435 to 1492. He is considered one of the founding fathers of the Cretan Renaissance along with Andreas Pavias, and Angelos Akotantos. Andreas' work was also heavily influenced by Venetian painting and the traditional Greek-Italian Byzantine style, blending the Palaeologan Renaissance with the Cretan Renaissance. He has an existing catalog of over sixty works attributed to him, and he signed his works in both Greek and Latin. He was a student of Angelos Akotantos and was also affiliated with Andreas Pavias. His family continued the tradition of painting, and his son Nikolaos Ritzos was notable for his work. Ritzo's Italian contemporaries were Paolo Uccello, Paolo Veneziano and Fra Angelico. They all painted a mixture of the Greek-Italian, Byzantine, and Italian Renaissance styles. Greek painters continued what became known as the maniera greca after art historian Giorgio Vasari coined the phrase.

According to the chronology of the New Testament written by Hippolytus of Thebes, Mary lived for 11 years after the death of her son Jesus, dying in AD 41. The Dormition of the Virgin became an important event in Christianity because she was the mother of Jesus Christ, the central figure of Christianity, the world's largest religion. According to the Greek Rite, she arose after the third day and was resurrected. The work of art is a testimony to the event. Artists have depicted the Dormition of the Virgin as a theme since the inception of the new religion. The Dormition has been featured in frescoes, sarcophagi, and paintings.

A common figure in the Dormition is Jesus appearing with a wrapped mummy-like figure who resembles Lazarus, which is actually an infant version of the Virgin Mary. The swaddled infant Mary represents her soul, symbolizing the purity and rebirth of the soul while it enters heaven. She symbolizes a newborn child beginning a new life.

The Hermeneia states that three bishops are represented in the scene of the Dormition: Dionysius the Areopagite, Hierotheos the Thesmothete, and Saint Timothy. When there is a fourth, it is James, brother of Jesus. Saint Timothy is typically depicted with dark hair. Two figures considered the pillars of the church are Saint Peter and Saint Paul. They are key figures in the Dormition Saint Peter is typically at the Virgin's head, sensing her body while Saint Paul bows at her feet. John the Apostle is another recurring figure, who is usually in the middle ground close to the bier. Jesus instructed John to care for his mother when he was on the cross, and he is an important figure at the Dormition. According to tradition, following the doubting nature of Doubting Thomas, he missed the Dormition by three days, but the Virgin appeared to him, giving him her holy girdle. The event is frequently depicted in artworks featuring the Dormition.

Italian painter Duccio, active in Siena, Tuscany, completed a similar version depicting the Virgin lying to our right in 1311. Paolo Veneziano, the founder of the Venetian School of painting, completed the Dormition of the Theotokos in 1333, and Catalonian painter Jaume Serra completed the Dormición de la Virgen María in 1362. Ritzos completed several versions of The Dormition of the Virgin between 1436 and 1492. The current version, entitled The Dormition of the Virgin can be found in Turin, Italy, at the Galleria Sabauda. In the 1500s, El Greco completed the Dormition of the Virgin and by the 1600s two Greek painters completed their own versions entitled: The Dormition and Assumption of the Virgin by Elias Moskos and The Dormition of the Virgin by Ioannis Moskos.

== Description ==
The artwork is a well-preserved example of the Proto Renaissance with a mixture of the Palaeologan Renaissance technique featuring characteristics of Venetian painting. It was completed in the second half of the 1400s. The height of the work was 22 in. (56 cm), while the width was 17.3 in. (44 cm). The materials used were tempera and gold leaf on a wood panel.

The Virgin Mary lies on her funeral bier, which is draped with the typical red curtain-like cloth with striations and folds of fabric with gold decorative trim. In this version, her head is to our right. The Theotokos is dressed in her traditional garment. Saint Peter is at her head with a thymiaterion censing her body. Directly over her head, John the Apostle grasps her bier while he gazes upon her. Saint Paul appears at her legs, bowing to her while his body lies on the funeral bier. Behind him, an army of angels has arrived to take Mary's body to heaven. Each angel has a golden halo, while some carry spheres. Each angel has the same face. Saint Peter, Saint Paul, and John the Apostle are typically featured in works of the Dormition. Saint Peter and Saint Paul are the pillars of the church, while John the Apostle was told by Jesus at his crucifixion to care for his mother.

Another group of figures typical of the dormition scene are the two bishops dressed in episcopal vestments, Dionysius the Areopagite and Hierotheos the Thesmothete. The scene is filled with figures such as the apostles and women. Jesus holds the celestial infant Mary, who is swaddled in his arms. The baby symbolizes the Virgin's soul, filled with purity. The rebirth of her soul symbolizes new life as it enters heaven. They are engulfed in a half-egg-shaped mandorla surrounded by high-ranking angels, including a seraphim. To the left and right of the mandorla in black in white appear eleven apostles, excluding Thomas the Apostle, who appears in the top to our left of the Virgin Mary figure above the large mandorla. She appears in a second, smaller mandorla, giving Saint Thomas her holy girdle. Saint Thomas received the holy girdle because he missed the Dormition of Mary. The belt continues the Doubting Thomas sequence from Jesus' resurrection. The work was signed by the painter.

== Gallery ==
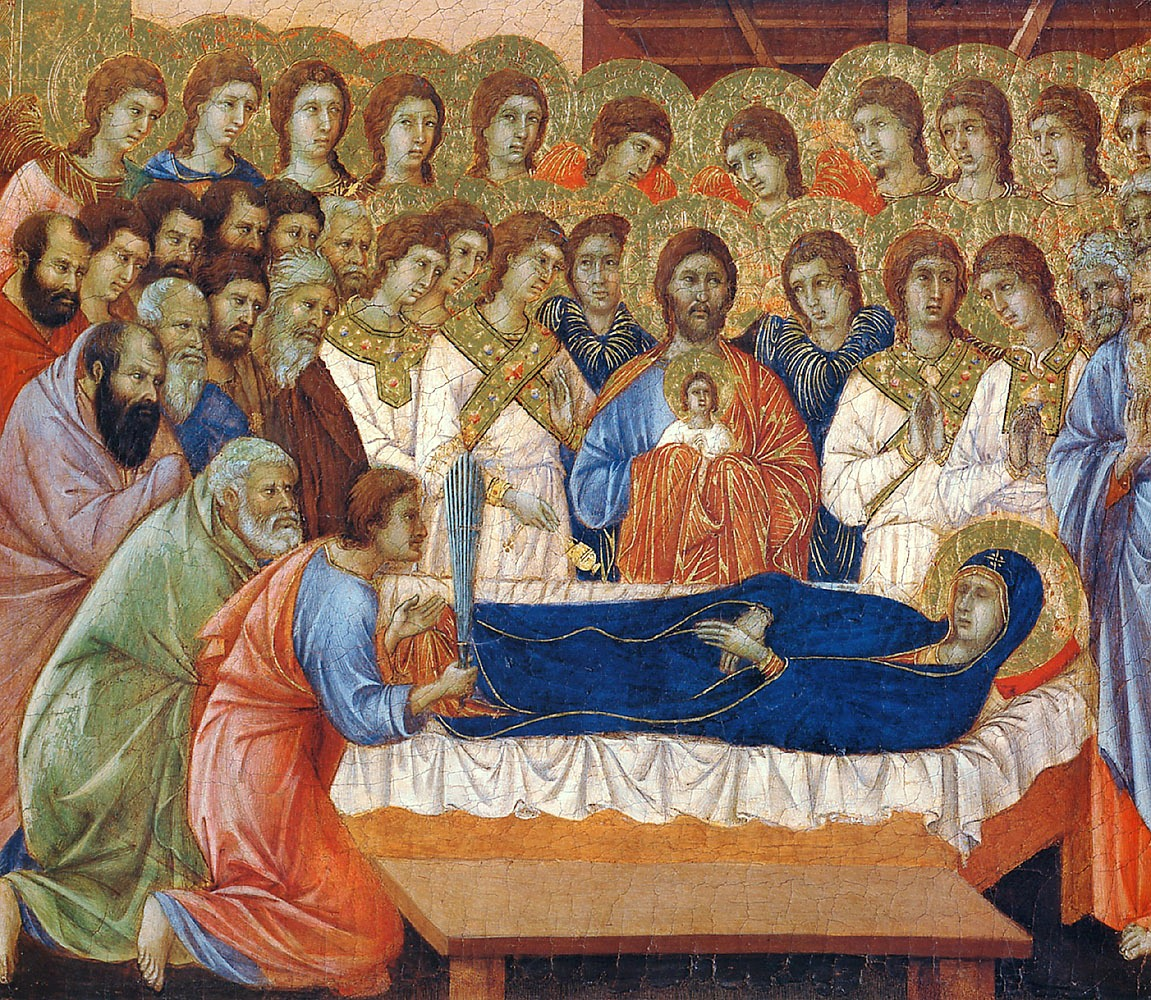
Dormation of the Virgin, by Duccio c. 1308–1311

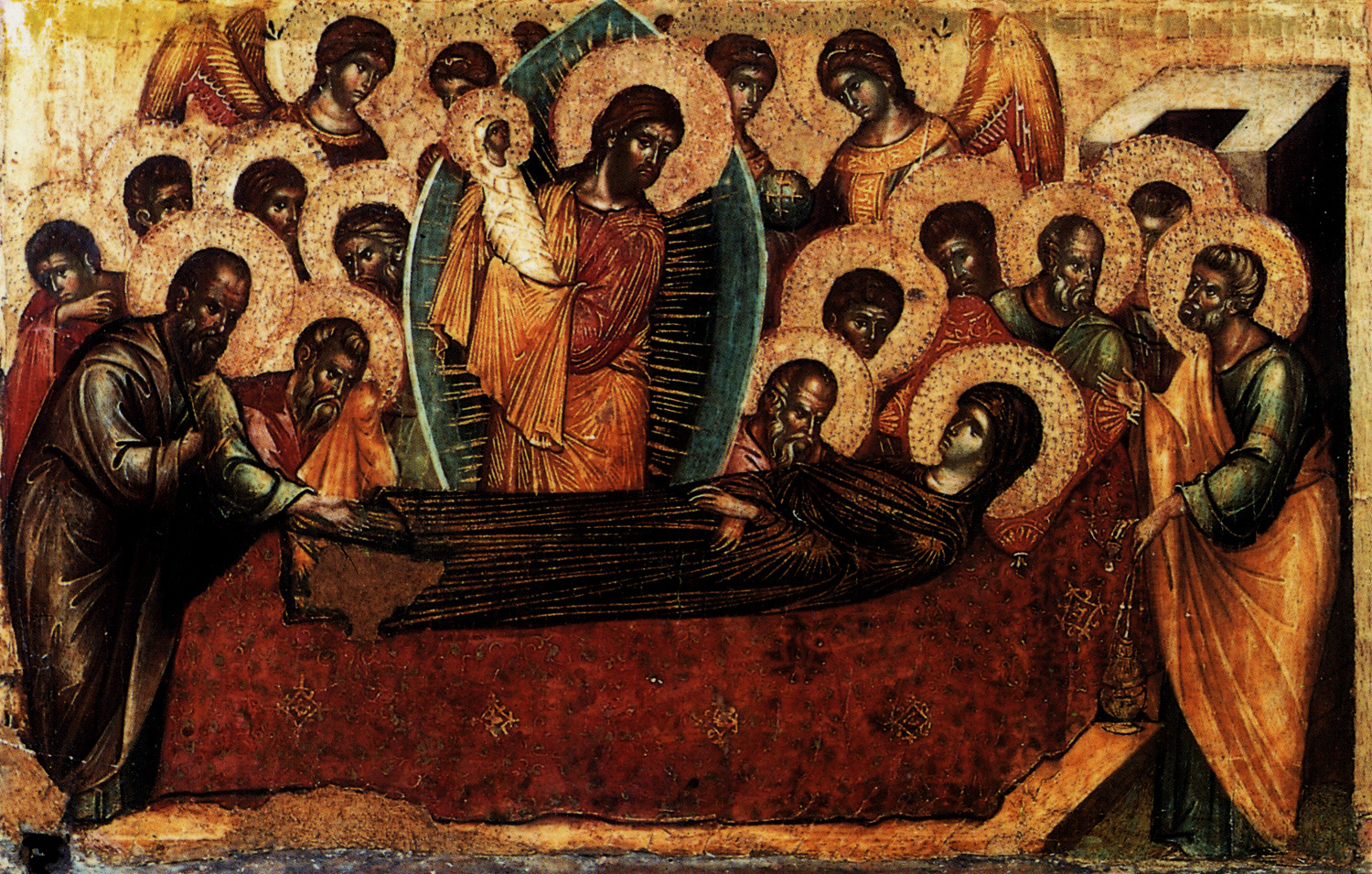
Dormition of the Theotokos, by Paolo Veneziano c. 1333

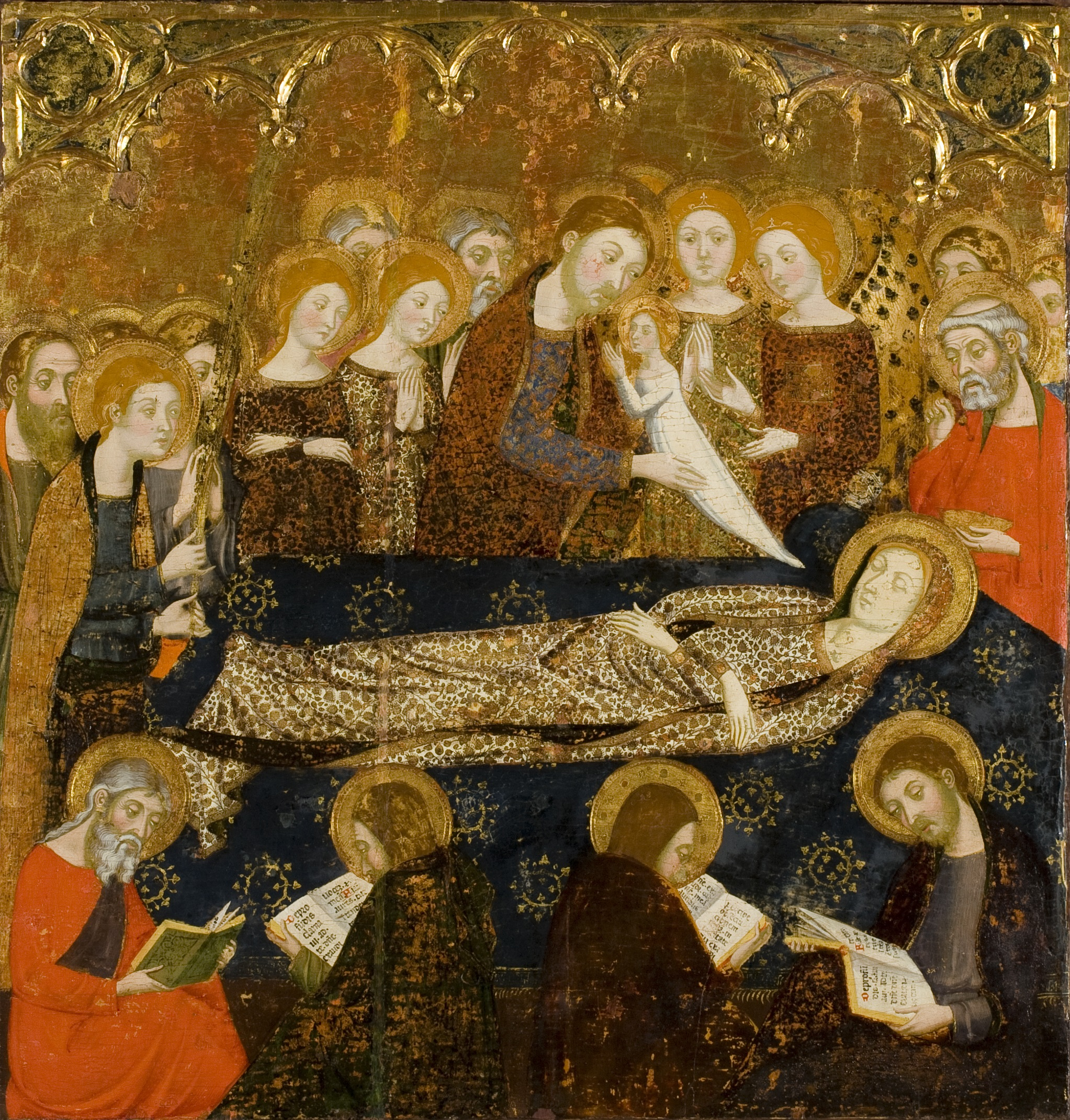
Dormición de la Virgen María, by Jaume Serra c. 1362

== Bibliography ==
- Hatzidakis, Manolis; Drakopoulou, Evgenia (1997). Έλληνες Ζωγράφοι μετά την Άλωση (1450-1830). Τόμος 2: Καβαλλάρος - Ψαθόπουλος [Greek Painters after the Fall of Constantinople (1450-1830). Volume 2: Kavallaros - Psathopoulos] (PDF). Athens: Center for Modern Greek Studies, National Research Foundation. hdl:10442/14088. ISBN 960-7916-00-X. Archived from the original on 2025-08-12.
- Richardson, Carol M.; Woods, Kim W.; Lymberopoulou, Angeliki (2007). Viewing Renaissance Art. New Haven and London: Yale University Press. ISBN 9780300123432.
- Speake, Graham (2021). Renaissance, Veneto-Cretan Encyclopedia of Greece and the Hellenic Tradition. London And New York: Rutledge Taylor & Francis Group. p. 1442. ISBN 9781135942069.
- Kitzinger, Ernst (1990). The Mosaics of St. Marys of the Admiral in Palermo. Washington: Dumbarton Oaks. ISBN 9780884021797.
- Agrigoroaei, Vladimir (2022). The Culture of Latin Greece Seven Tales from the 13th and 14th Centuries. Leiden, NL: Brill. ISBN 9789004524224.
- Lacey, Joann (2021). History of Art and Architecture: Volume One. Bergland, MI: Sugar Creek.
- Crowe, Joseph Archer; Cavalcaselle, Giovanni Battista (1903). A History of Painting in Italy: Giotto and the Giottesques. New York, NY: Charles Scribner's Sons.
