= The Dormition and Assumption of the Virgin (Moskos) =

Painting by Elias Moskos

- Η Κοίμηση και η Ανάσταση της Θεοτόκου (Greek), La Dormizione e l'Assunzione della Vergine (Italian)
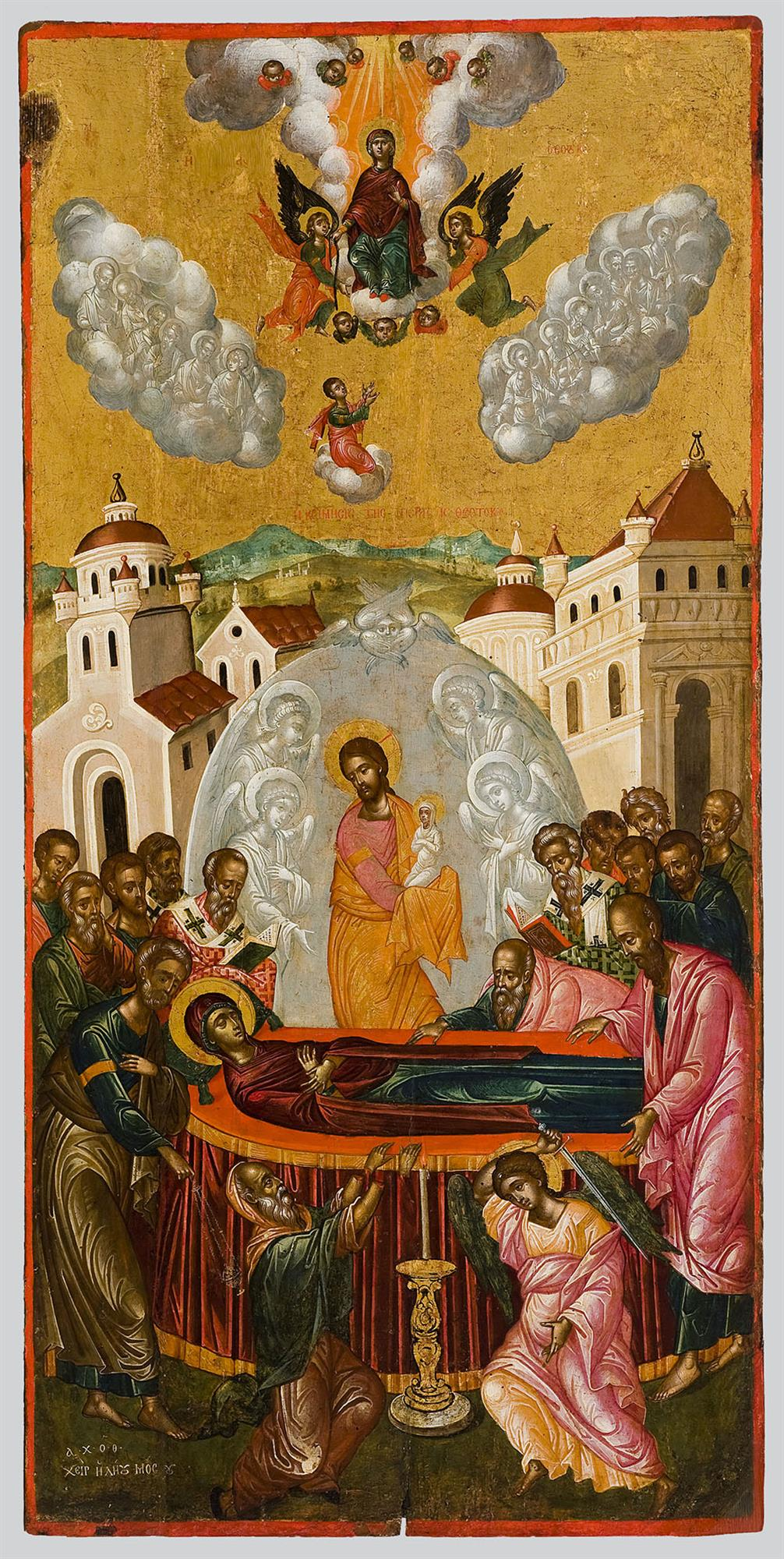
- Artist: Elias Moskos
- Year: c. 1679
- Medium: tempera on wood
- Movement: Late Cretan School
- Subject: The Dormition and Assumption of the Virgin
- Dimensions: 95 cm × 47 cm (37.4 in × 18.5 in)
- Location: Byzantine and Christian Museum, Athens, Greece
- Owner: Byzantine and Christian Museum
- Accession: ΒΧΜ 02054
- Website: Official Website

The Dormition and Assumption of the Virgin is a tempera painting created by Elias Moskos. Moskos was a representative of the Late Cretan School and the Heptanese School. He migrated to Zakinthos from Crete. He was originally from the city of Rethymno. He participated in the transition of Greek painting from the Cretan School to the more refined Heptanese School of the Ionian islands. He also taught painting. His activity was from 1645 to 1687. He was active on the islands of Crete, Zakynthos, and Kefalonia. He was heavily involved with church committees. Church committees commissioned paintings. Half of his works were signed fifty-two of his works survived.

The Dormition and Assumption of the Virgin was a popular theme painted by both Greek and Italian artists since the dawn of the new religion. The chronology of the New Testament states that Mary lived for 11 years after the death of Jesus, dying in AD 41 according to Hippolytus of Thebes. The sanhedrin feared that her body would disappear. According to the Greek Rite she arouse after the third day. She was resurrected. The work of art is a testimony to the event. Proto-Renaissance painter Fra Angelico completed a version of the theme around 1432 called Death and the Assumption of the Virgin. Greek painters employed a common technique during the early Cretan School following the traditional lines of Greek, Italian Byzantine painting. Andreas Ritzos completed several versions featuring the theme in the second half of the 15th century. One version is entitled The Dormition of the Virgin. During the 16th century, El Greco completed a similar version called Dormition of the Virgin. In the 17th century, one of Mosko's contemporaries Victor also finished a similar painting. Mosko's work escaped the traditional confinement of the early Cretan School. His work features complex qualities not existent in earlier versions. The work of art is part of the collection of the Byzantine and Christian Museum.

== History ==
The work of art was completed in 1679 on the island of Zakynthos. The materials used were tempera and gold leaf on a wood panel. The height of the work was 37.4 in. (94.9 cm) and the width 18.5 in. (46.9 cm). The work was completed nine years before the artist's death. The work of art is an example of the craftsmanship of the late Cretan School. The painter employs more modernistic techniques on the wood panel. The artist presents a foreground, middle ground, and background. The work is comparable to Proto-Renaissance paintings. The Death and the Assumption of the Virgin is a similar work completed by Fra Angelico around 1432. Andreas Ritzo's early Cretan painting is also very similar to Mosko's work. El Greco's work Dormition of the Virgin is also in-line with Mosko's icon. All five works are in the same style.

In the foreground, two figures appear kneeling in front of the dead heavenly mother. The figure on our left grabs the holy surface on which the Virgin rests. His name was Iefonia (Ιεφονία). He was a sanhedrin priest who tried to disturb the body of the Virgin Mary. The sanhedrin feared the disappearance of her body and her resurrection. The painting is a testimony of her resurrection. To Iefonia’s left, an angel wields a sword, stopping Iefonia. The candle stands between them, establishing the space. The area the Virgin rests on is covered with a brilliantly painted curtain-like cloth with clear lines and folds of fabric. The figure to our left-right over the Virgin's head is Saint Peter holding a thymiaterion incensing the holy body of the Virgin Mary. Paul the Apostle is bowing at her feet, and John the Apostle is kneeling at her body to the right of Paul. Saint Paul and Saint Peter are considered the pillars of the Church and are frequently in this position in paintings of the Dormition of the Virgin Mary. Jesus instructed John the Apostle to watch over his mother during the crucifixion. He is frequently in this position in paintings of this theme. The entire group of eleven apostles around her statuesque figure are grieving. When there are three bishops present, they are Dionysius the Areopagite, Hierotheos the Thesmothete, and Saint Timothy; two are reading from a sacred book to the right and left of Jesus. Sometimes, when there are four bishops James, brother of Jesus is also represented.

Jesus holds a small, swaddled figure resembling an infant that represents Mary's soul. The infant figure symbolizes the purity and rebirth of the soul while it enters heaven, the same way a newborn child begins a new life. Surrounding Jesus, a magnificent aura of angels appears in ghostly form, headed by a seraphim. Behind the funeral, a spectacular group of buildings appears. The architecture is far more evolved than in earlier works. The artists adequately defined the space. Behind the buildings, a mountainous landscape appears in the background. In the upper portion of the work. The Virgin is floating on a cloud surrounded by angels. A beam of light appears behind her. Clouds appear to her left and right, filled with figures. The divine Virgin appears, featuring a heavenly, majestic, exalted pose, wearing her traditional garments. She is holding the holy belt. Saint Thomas the Apostle appears on a cloud-ready to receive the belt.

== Gallery ==
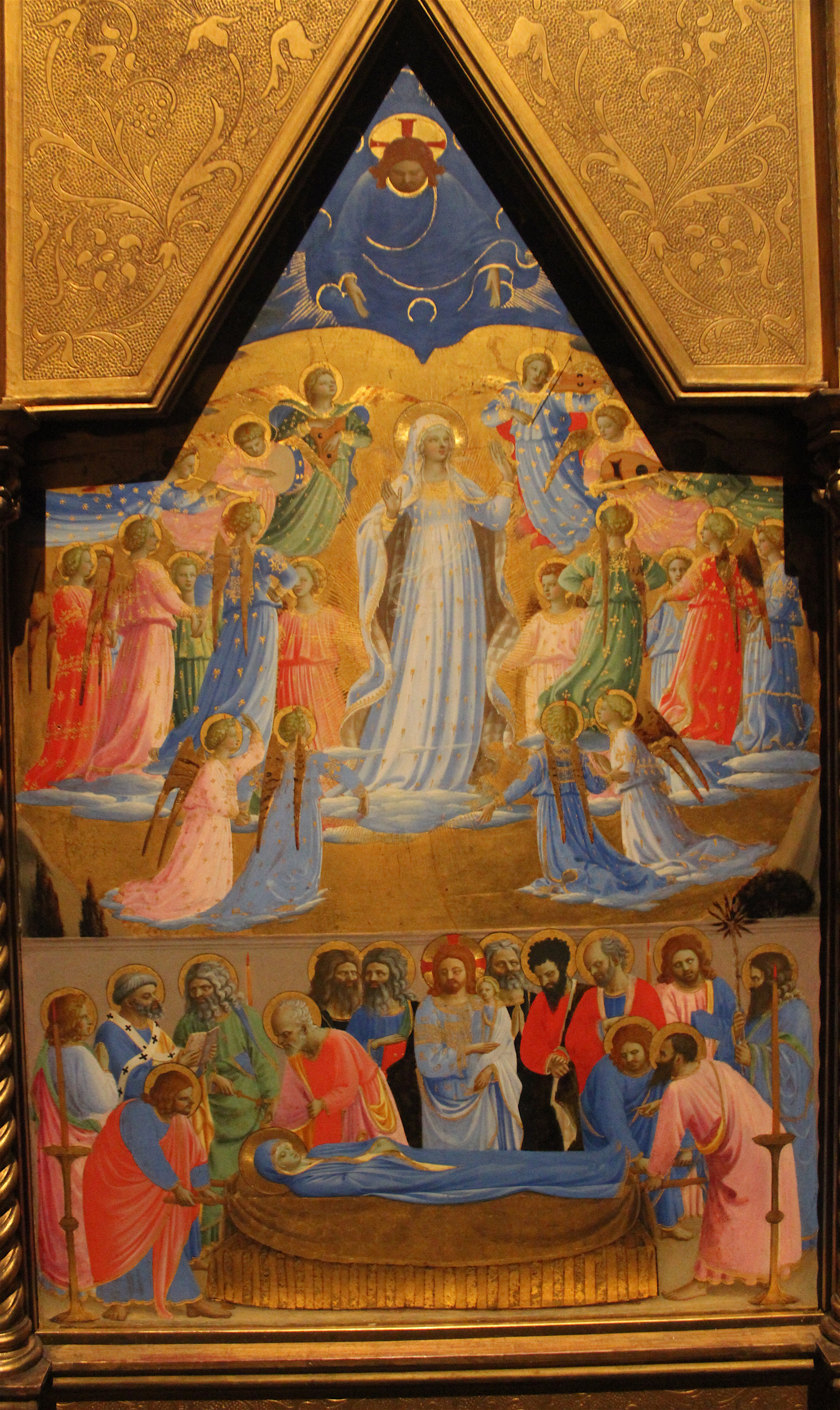
The Dormition and Assumption Fra Angelico

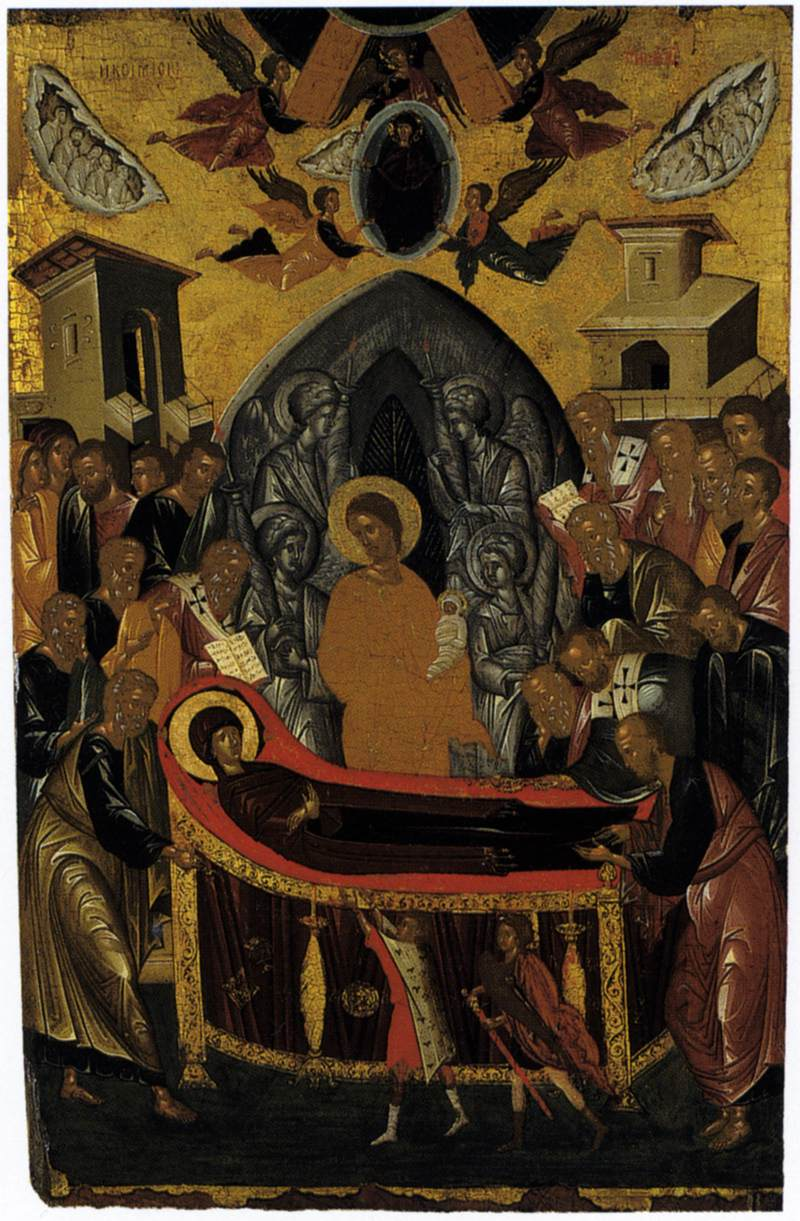
The Dormition Ritzos

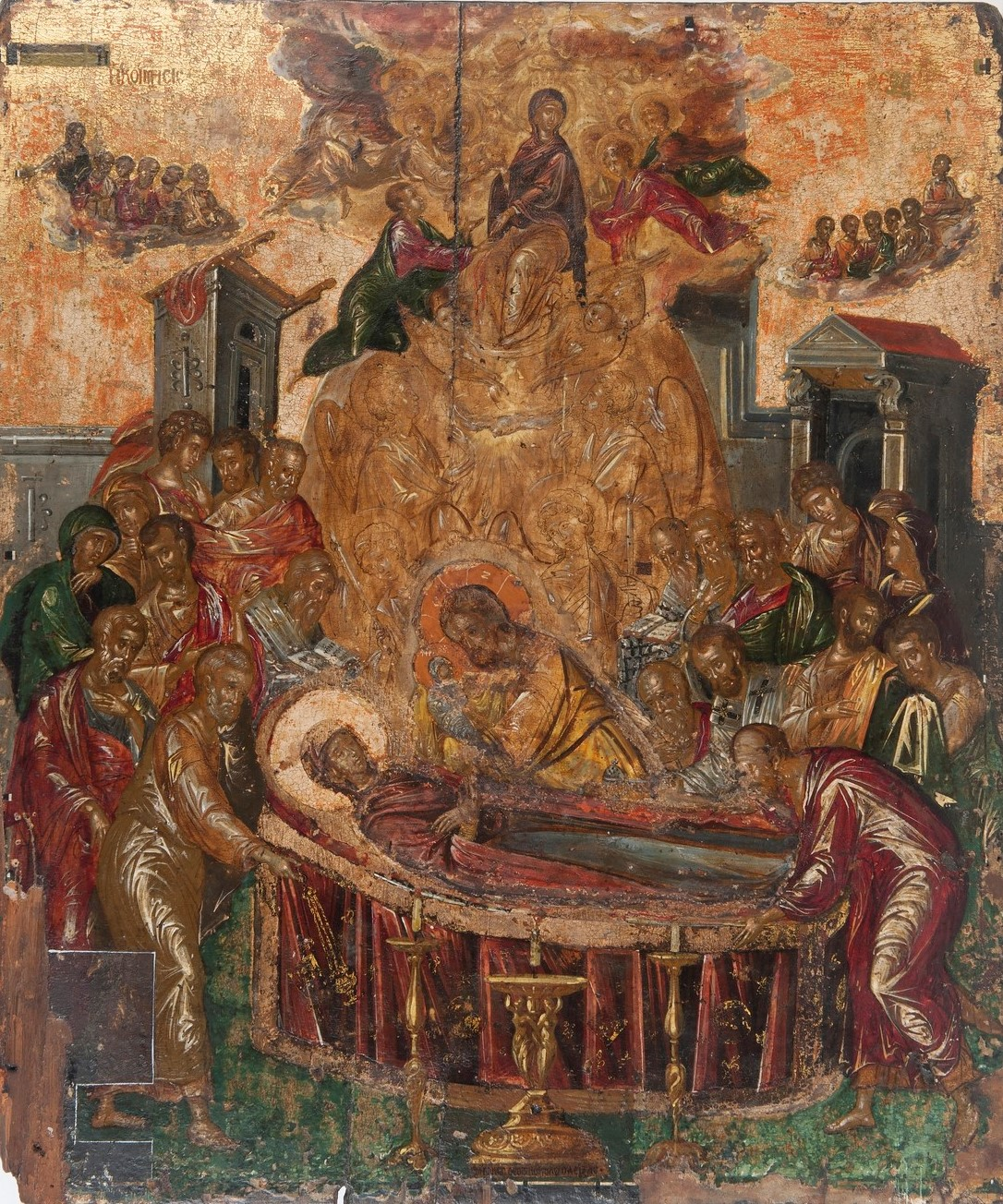
The Dormition El Greco

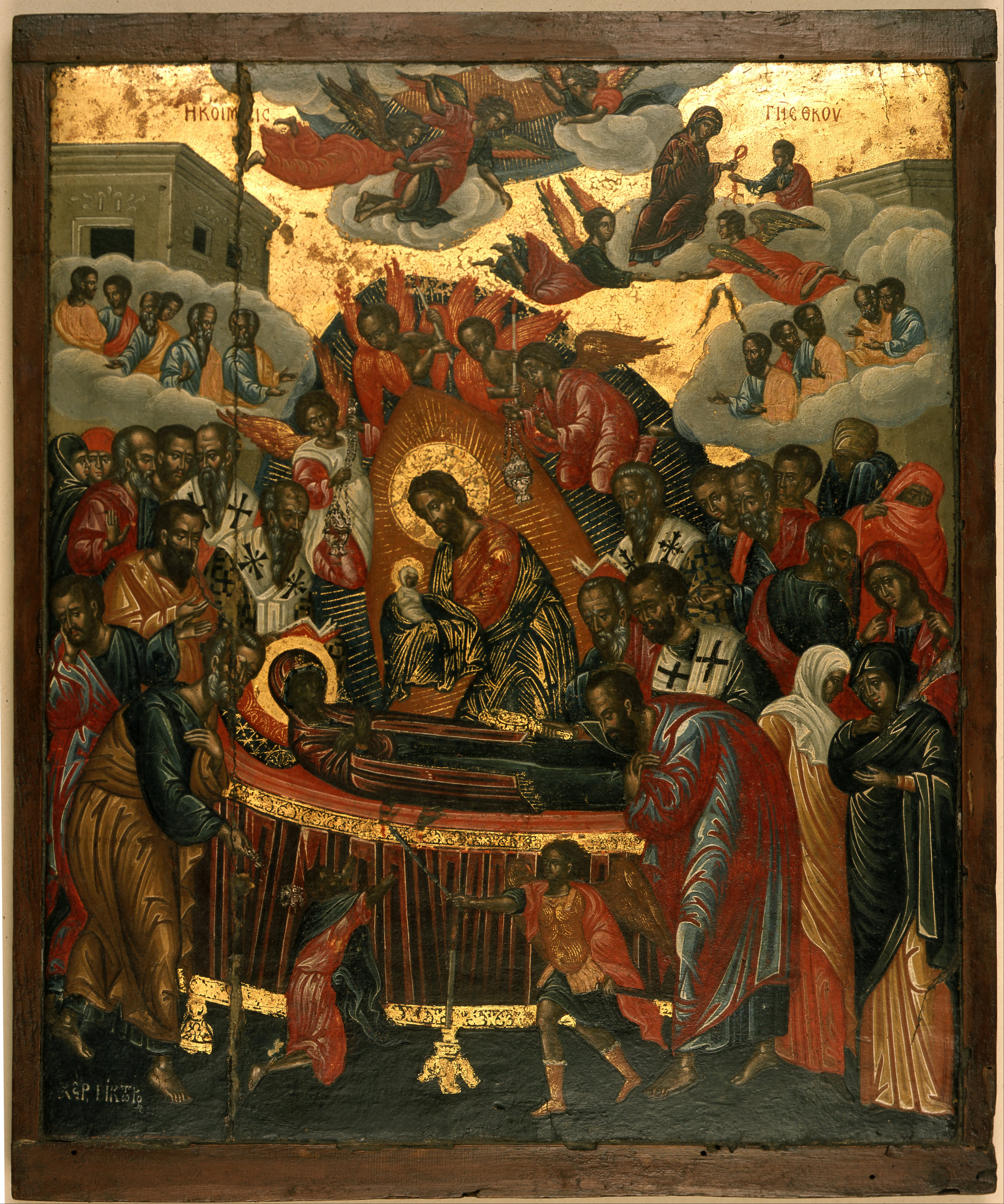
The Dormition Victor

== Bibliography ==
- Hatzidakis, Manolis; Drakopoulou, Evgenia (1997). Έλληνες Ζωγράφοι μετά την Άλωση (1450-1830). Τόμος 2: Καβαλλάρος - Ψαθόπουλος [Greek Painters after the Fall of Constantinople (1450-1830). Volume 2: Kavallaros - Psathopoulos]. Athens: Center for Modern Greek Studies, National Research Foundation. hdl:10442/14088. ISBN 960-7916-00-X.
- Achimastou-Potamianou, Myrtali (1988). "Η Κοίμηση της Θεοτόκου σε δύο Κρητικές Εικόνες της Κω" [Τhe Dormition of the Virgin in two Cretan Icons from Kos.]. Deltion of the Christian Archaeological Society. XAE 13 (Delta): 125–156. doi:10.12681/dchae.986.
- Kitzinger, Ernst (1990). The Mosaics of St. Marys of the Admiral in Palermo. Washington: Dumbarton Oaks. ISBN 9780884021797.
- Agrigoroaei, Vladimir (2022). The Culture of Latin Greece Seven Tales from the 13th and 14th Centuries. Leiden, NL: Brill. ISBN 9789004524224.
