= The Dormition of the Virgin (Moskos) =

Painting by Ioannis Moskos

- Η Κοίμηση της Θεοτόκου (Greek), Dormizione di Maria (Italian)
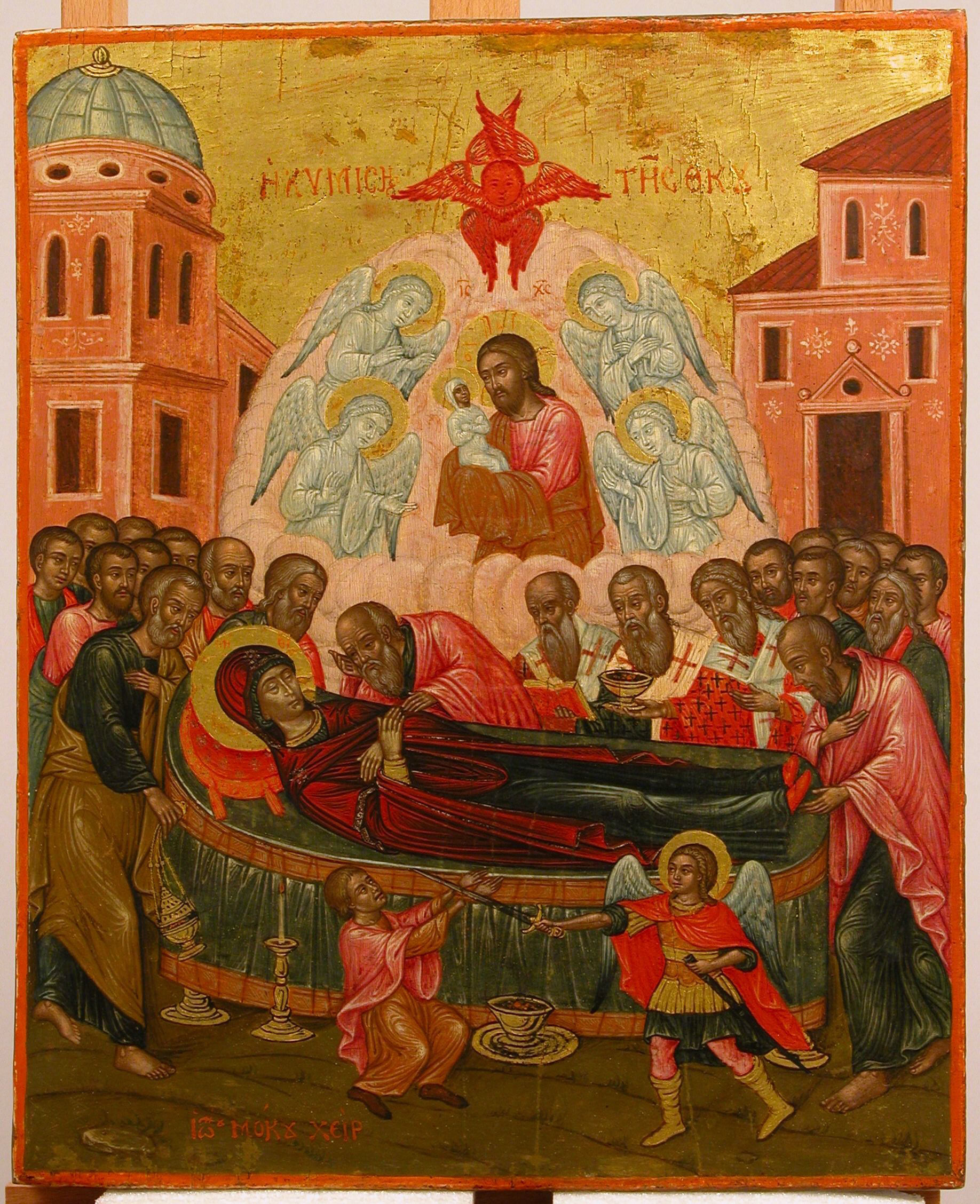
- Artist: Ioannis Moskos
- Year: 1650-1721
- Medium: tempera on wood
- Movement: Late Cretan School
- Subject: The Dormition of the Virgin
- Dimensions: 34.3 cm × 28.6 cm (13.5 in × 11.25 in)
- Location: Metropolitan Museum of Art, New York City, USA
- Owner: Metropolitan Museum of Art
- Accession: 33.79.17
- Website: Official

The Dormition of the Virgin is a tempera painting created by Greek painter Ioannis Moskos. Although some sources related to the painting spell his name Ioannes Mokos. Moskos was active from 1650 to 1721. During the same period, there were two other painters of the same name, Elias and Leos Moskos, possibly his relatives. Ioannis belonged to the Venetian-influenced late Cretan and Heptanese Schools of painting. He was born in Rethimno, Crete, but migrated to Venice, Italy, where he completed works for the church San Giorgio dei Greci and was also married by the Greek painter and priest Philotheos Skoufos at the same church to Ergina Klarotzanopoula. Ioannis' catalog features over forty-four existing works.

Greek and Italian artists since the dawn of Christianity employed the Dormition of the Virgin as a theme. The Virgin Mary was the mother of Jesus Christ, the central figure of Christianity, the world's largest religion. Mary is also an important figure of Christianity, venerated under various titles such as virgin or queen. The chronology of the New Testament states that Mary lived for 11 years after the death of Jesus, dying in AD 41 according to Hippolytus of Thebes.

The institution called the Sanhedrin, which was responsible for the trial of Jesus and guarding the tomb of Jesus, feared his disciples might steal his body and claim that he had risen from the dead. The same organization feared Mary’s body would also disappear due to claims of her resurrection. A figure from the Sanhedrin named Iefonia (Ιεφονία) is traditionally present in this style of painting in the foreground under the sword of an angel who is stopping him. According to the Greek Rite, she arose after the third day and was resurrected. The work of art is a testimony to the event. Iefonia can be seen again in Elias Moskos' The Dormition and Assumption of the Virgin and Victor's The Dormition of the Virgin.

Another important figure commonly repeated thematically in these works is a wrapped mummy-like figure who resembles Lazarus. According to historians, the infant mummy-like figure is the Virgin Mary. A popular common theme in painting is the Virgin and Child, but now Jesus takes on the role of the figure holding the infant, which can be viewed as Jesus and Child. Mary is a swaddled figure resembling an infant that represents Mary's soul, symbolizing the purity and rebirth of the soul while it enters heaven, similar to a newborn child beginning a new life.

One of the earliest known depictions of The Dormition of the Virgin can be found in Istanbul, in a mosaic at Chora Church entitled Koimesis Mosaic painted between 1315-1321. Gherardo Starnina completed another significant depiction of the Dormition of the Virgin between 1401 and 1410, entitled The Death of the Virgin. Around the same period, Ioannis completed The Dormition of the Virgin, Elias Moskos completed The Dormition and Assumption of the Virgin in 1679. Ioannis' version can be found in the Metropolitan Museum of Art in New York City. The work of art was a gift donated by Mrs. Henry Morgenthau in 1933. Within the confines of the same institution, another version of the Dormition of the Virgin exists, completed in 1484 by Bartolomeo Vivarini called Death of the Virgin.

== Description ==
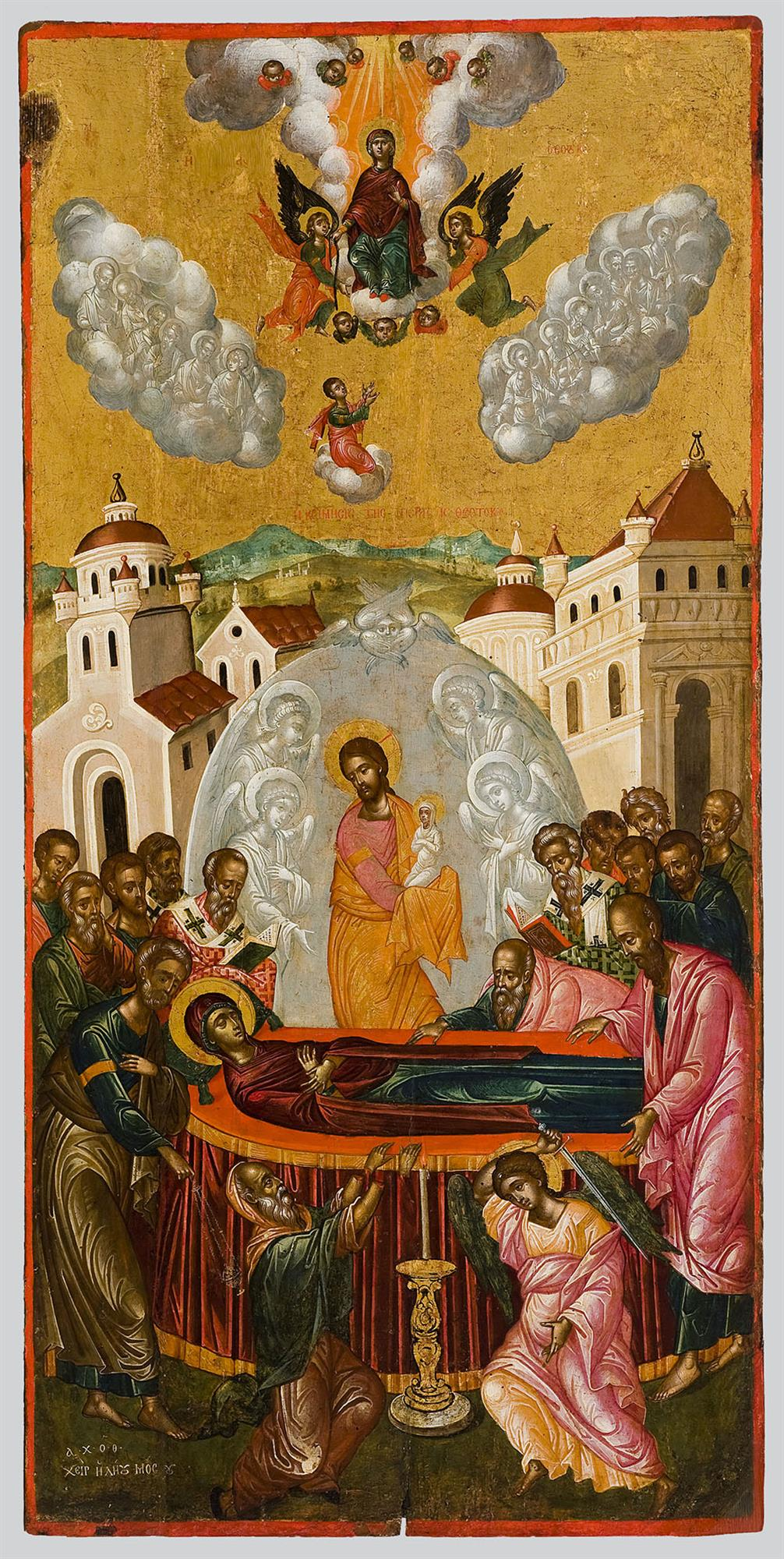
The Dormition and Assumption of the Virgin by Elias Moskos, c. 1679, completed around the same period

The work of art was completed sometime between 1650-1721, possibly in Crete, Venice, or the Ionian Islands. The materials used were tempera and gold leaf on a wood panel. The height of the work was 13.5 in. (34.3 cm) and the width 11.25 in. (28.6 cm). The work of art employs similar techniques used by Elias Moskos in The Dormition and Assumption of the Virgin and is an example of the craftsmanship of the late Cretan School. Both painters utilize a modernist approach, integrating Venetian painting and the Cretan style, creating a more refined maniera greca.

Two small figures appear in the foreground; the painter depicts an altercation between an angel with a sword and a man touching the funeral bier of the Virgin. The man touching the surface was Iefonia (Ιεφονία), a sanhedrin priest who tried to disturb the body of the Virgin Mary because they feared the disappearance of her body and her resurrection. The painting is a testimony of her resurrection.

The funeral bier is covered with a decorative curtain-like cloth with clear lines and folds of fabric. Saint Peter is the figure to our left, hovering over the Virgin's head using the thymiaterion to incense the body of the holy Virgin Mary. The figure bowing at her feet is Paul the Apostle. Both Saint Peter and Saint Paul are considered pillars of the Church and are commonly depicted in this manner in paintings of the Dormition of Mary.

John the Apostle also appears at Mary's head in the middle ground, resting his hand on his face, while touching the funeral bier and bowing to the sacred mother. John the Apostle was instructed to watch over Jesus' mother during his crucifixion and plays a significant role in the works of the Dormition of Mary. The four figures behind John the Apostle to our right relative to John are four bishops Dionysius the Areopagite, Hierotheos the Thesmothete, James, brother of Jesus, and Saint Timothy wearing episcopal vestments, one is reading from a sacred book, and another holds a chalice. The fourth is behind the three figures which are more readily apparent.

Jesus holds a swaddled figure resembling an infant that represents the Virgin Mary. The infant symbolizes Mary's soul, featuring the purity and rebirth of the soul while it enters heaven, as a newborn child begins new life. All of the apostles are present except Saint Thomas. The painter's signature is at the bottom of the work.

== See also ==
- Christ Bearing the Cross

== Gallery ==
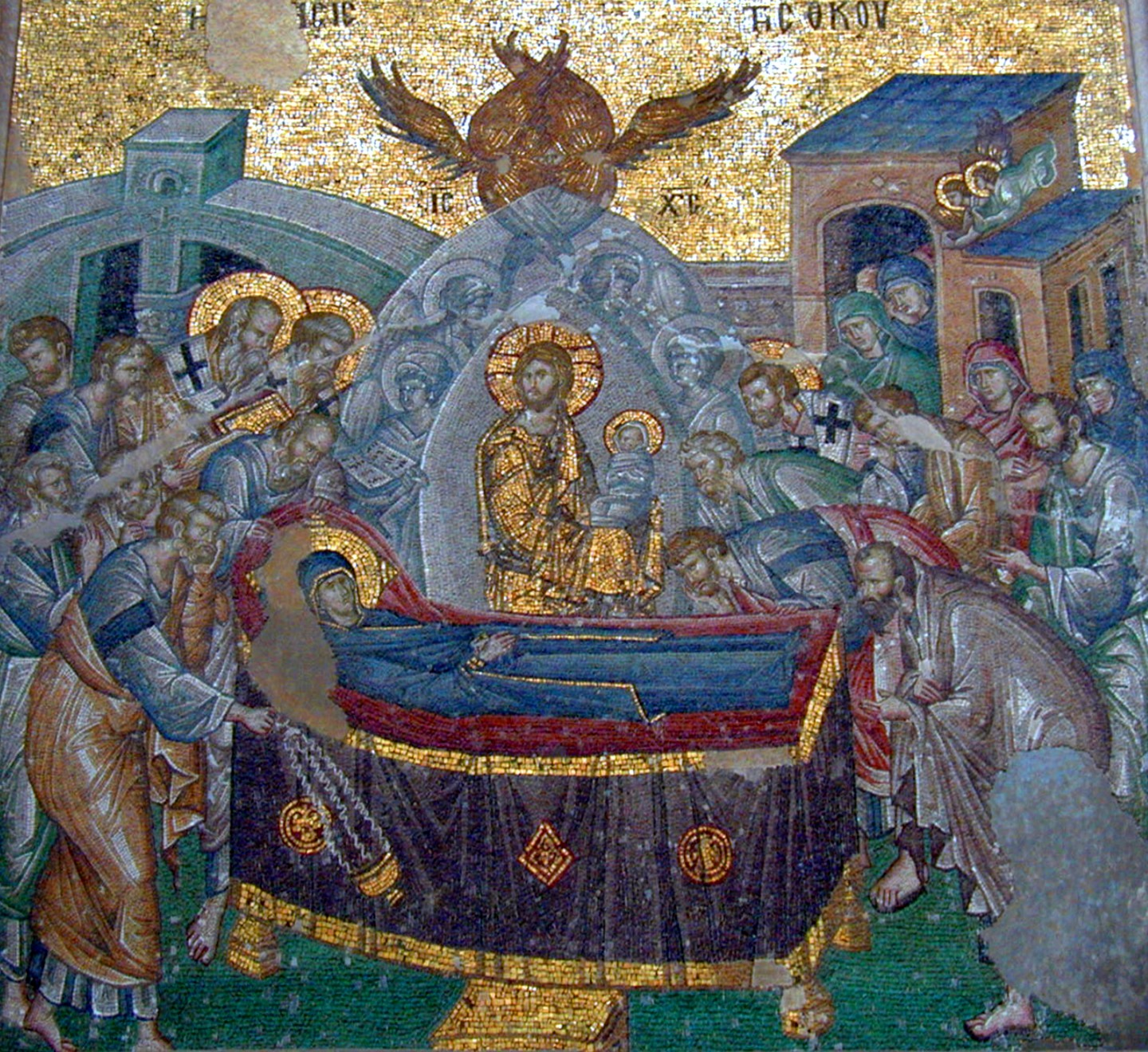
Kimisis Tis Theotokou by Master of Constantinople, c. 1315-1321

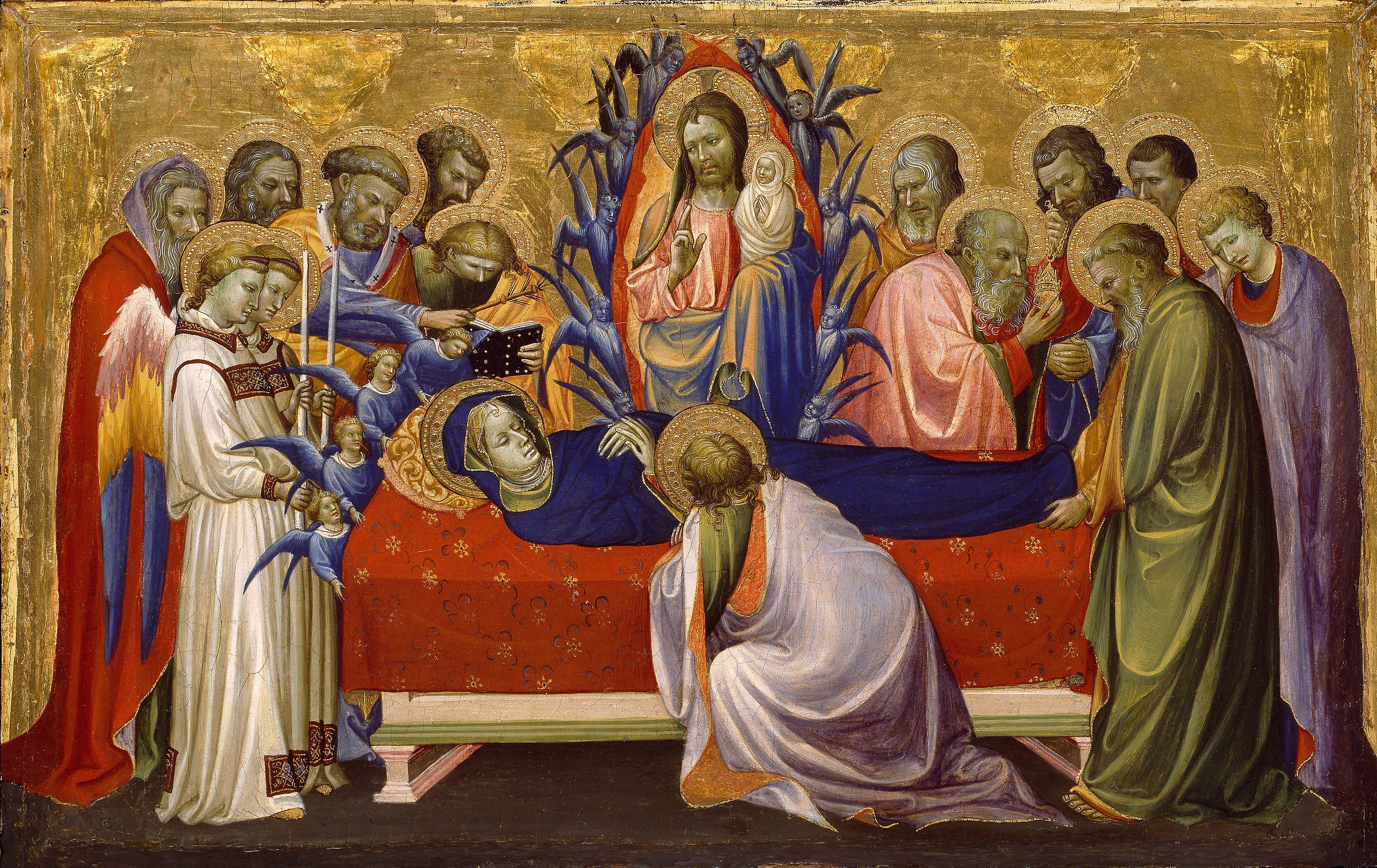
The Death of the Virgin by Gherardo Starnina c. 1401 to 1410

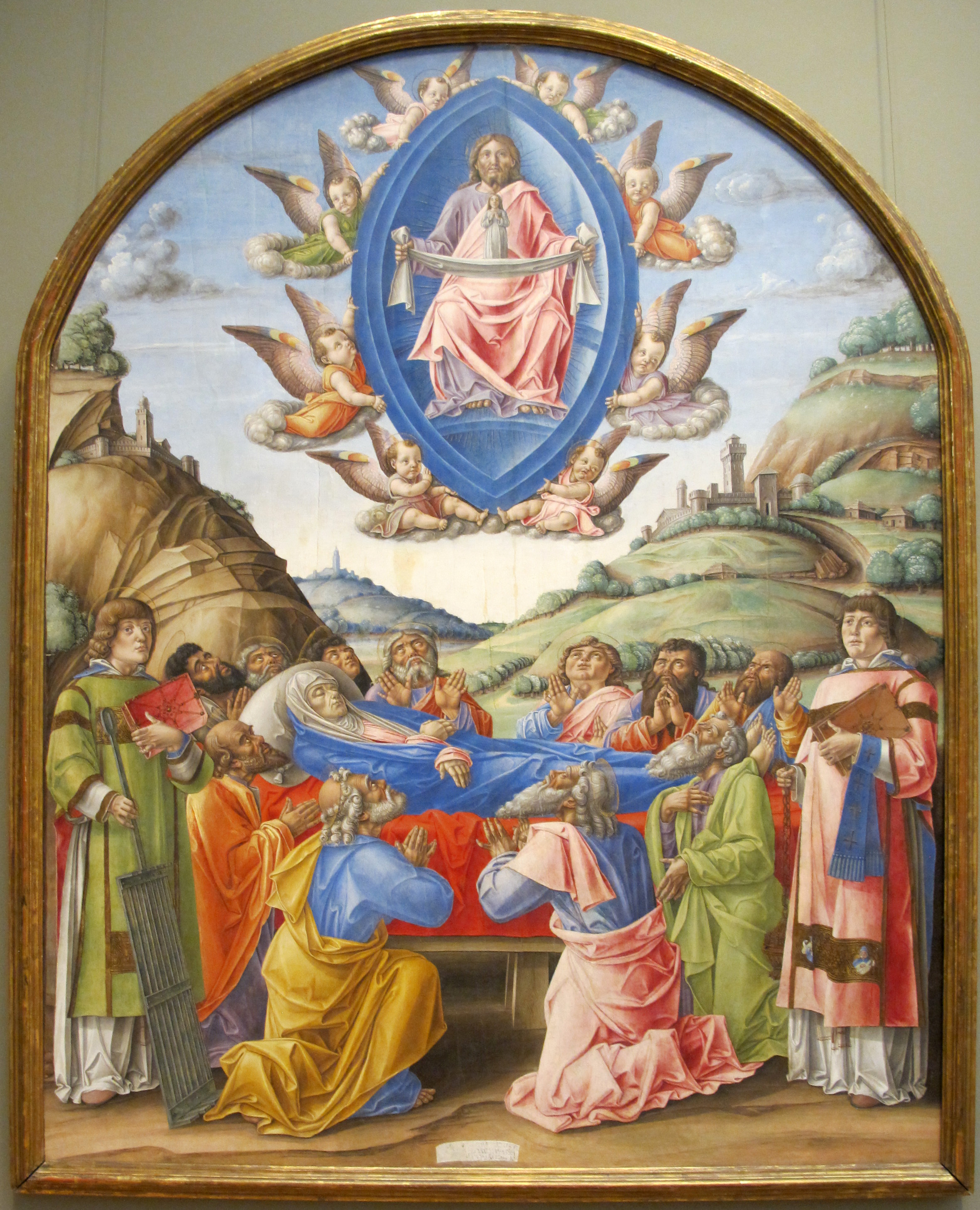
The Death of the Virgin by Bartolomeo Vivarini, c. 1484

== Bibliography ==
- Hatzidakis, Manolis; Drakopoulou, Evgenia (1997). Έλληνες Ζωγράφοι μετά την Άλωση (1450-1830). Τόμος 2: Καβαλλάρος - Ψαθόπουλος [Greek Painters after the Fall of Constantinople (1450-1830). Volume 2: Kavallaros - Psathopoulos] (PDF). Athens: Center for Modern Greek Studies, National Research Foundation. hdl:10442/14088. ISBN 960-7916-00-X. Archived from the original on 2025-08-12.
- Tselenti-Papadopoulou, Niki G. (2002). Οι Εικονες της Ελληνικης Αδελφοτητας της Βενετιας απο το 16ο εως το Πρωτο Μισο του 20ου Αιωνα: Αρχειακη Τεκμηριωση [The Icons of the Greek Brotherhood of Venice from 1600 to First Half of the 20th Century] (PDF) (in Greek). Athens: Ministry of Culture Publication of the Archaeological Bulletin No. 81. ISBN 960-214-221-9.
- Achimastou-Potamianou, Myrtali (1988). "Η Κοίμηση της Θεοτόκου σε δύο Κρητικές Εικόνες της Κω" [Τhe Dormition of the Virgin in two Cretan Icons from Kos.]. Deltion of the Christian Archaeological Society. XAE 13 (Delta): 125–156. doi:10.12681/dchae.986.
- Kitzinger, Ernst (1990). The Mosaics of St. Marys of the Admiral in Palermo. Washington: Dumbarton Oaks. ISBN 9780884021797.
- Agrigoroaei, Vladimir (2022). The Culture of Latin Greece Seven Tales from the 13th and 14th Centuries. Leiden, NL: Brill. ISBN 9789004524224.
- Lacey, Joann (2021). History of Art and Architecture: Volume One. Bergland, MI: Sugar Creek.
