= Hierotheos =

Hierotheos or Hierotheus is a given name of Greek etymology: ἱερός + θεός, "holy god".

The name may also written as Hierothei in some languages. The Russian-language forms of the name are Iyerofey (Иерофей; formal, archaic, still in use as a monastic name) and Yerofey (modern). Serbian form: Jerotej, Romanian: Ierotei or Erotei. Italian: Ieroteo.

Notable persons with the name include.

- Hierotheos the Thesmothete, traditional first bishop of Athens in the 1st century
- Hierotheus of Segovia, legendary bishop of Segovia in the 1st century
- Hierotheos (missionary bishop), active in Hungary in the 10th century
- Hierotheos (monk), Constantinopolitan letter writer in the 12th century
- Hierotheos, religious name of John Komnenos Molyvdos (1657–1719), Greek Orthodox metropolitan and scholar
- Hierotheus Confluentinus (1682–1766), German priest and writer
- Hierotheus I of Alexandria, Greek Patriarch of Alexandria in 1825–1845
- Hierotheus II of Alexandria, Greek Patriarch of Alexandria in 1847–1858
- Hierotheos of Antioch, Greek Patriarch of Antioch in 1850–1885
- Hierotheus of Jerusalem, Greek Patriarch of Jerusalem in 1875–1882
- Hierotheos Vlachos (born 1945), Greek Orthodox metropolitan and theologian
- Hierotheus of Ahtopol (born 1977), Bulgarian Orthodox bishop

== See also ==
- Book of Hierotheos, purported work of Hierotheos the Thesmothete
