= Yerofeyev =

Yerofeyev (masculine) or Yerofyeva (feminine), also transliterated as Erofeev or Erofeyev, is a Russian surname. It means "(someone) related to Yerofey".

Notable people with the surname include:

Aleksandr Yerofeyev, Russian name of Aleksandrs Jerofejevs, Latvian ice hockey player

- Vasily Yerofeyev (1822–1884), Russian geologist
- Mikhail Yerofeyev (1857–1941), Russian general
- Oleg Yerofeyev (1940–2022), Russian admiral
- Olga Erofeeva (born 1985), Russian triathlete
- Tamara Erofeyeva (born 1937), Russian linguist
- Venedikt Yerofeyev (1938–1990), Russian writer
- Viktor Yerofeyev (born 1947), Russian writer
- Vladimir Yerofeyev (diplomat) (1920–2011), Soviet diplomat
- Vladimir Yakovlevich Yerofeyev (1909–1986), Soviet ambassador
