= Yeroshin =

Yeroshin, feminine: Yeroshina is a Russian patronymic surname derived from the given name Yeroshka, a diminitive for "Yerofey". Surnames with a similar derivation are Yerokhin and Yeroshkin. Notable people with the surname include:

- Radya Yeroshina, Soviet cross-country skier
- Yevgeniy Yeroshin (born 1950), Russian politician, M.P.

== See also ==
- Nikolaus von Jeroschin, German chronicler
