= Yerofeich =

Yerofeich or Erofeich (Russian: Ерофеич) is a colloquial form of the patronymic for the given name Yerofey. The regular patronymic is "Yerofeyevich". Typically patronymics of this type (without the first name) are informally applied to older men. The name may refer to:

== Fictional characters ==
- In A Soldier Came Back from the Front (1971 Soviet film)
- In Front Beyond the Front Line (1977 Soviet film)
- In Front in the Rear of the Enemy (1981 Soviet film)
- In Trial on the Road (1986 Soviet film)

== See also ==
- Yerofeich (vodka), Russian traditional homemade liquor
