= Yerokhin =

Yerokhin, feminine: Yerokhina is a Russian patronymic surname derived from the given name Yeroshka, a diminitive for "Yerofey". Surnames with a similar derivation are Yeroshin and Yeroshkin. Notable people with the surname include:

- Aleksandr Yerokhin (born 1989), Russian footballer
- Igor Yerokhin (born 1985), Russian race walker
- Valentin Yerokhin (born 1945), Russian footballer
- Viktor Yerokhin (1940-2014), Russian footballer
- Vladimir Yerokhin (1930-1996) Russian footballer
