= Yerofey =

Yerofey or Erofey (Russian: Ерофей is a Russian given name, an equivalent of Hierotheos. An archaic form, still used as a monastic name is Iyerofey (Иерофей. It is the base for a number of surnames: Yerofeyev; from diminutives: Yeroshkin, Yeroshin, Yerokhin, Yeroshchenko, Yeroshenko.

Notable people with the name include:

- Yerofey Khabarov (1603 – after 1671), was a Russian entrepreneur and explorer, the namesake of a number of various things
- Yerofey Ivanov (died 1669), nicknamed Almaz, Russian entrepreneur, Duma diak, printer, diplomat, The founder of the noble Almazov family

== See also ==
- Yerofeich
