= Yeroshkin =

Yeroshkin, feminine: Yeroshkina is a Russian patronymic surname derived from the given name Yeroshka, a diminitive for "Yerofey". Surnames with a similar derivation are Yerokhin and Yeroshin. Notable people with the surname include:

- Aleksei Yeroshkin, Russian professional football player
- Nikolay Yeroshkin (1920–1988, Soviet historian and educator
- Vitaly Yeroshkin (1928–2016), Mari Russian and Soviet historian, educator, writer, journalist, and Communist Party functionary
