= Iyerofey =

Iyerofey or Ierofey, (Russian: Иерофей) is a Russian masculine given name, derived from the Greek Hierotheos. It is an archaic name, nowadays used as a monastic name. Its layman equivalent is Yerofey. Notable people with the name include:

- ru:Иерофей (Афонин) (1893—1928), bishop of the Russian Orthodox Church
- ru:Иерофей (Лобачевский) (1789—1871), bishop of the Russian Orthodox Church, spiritual writer
- ru:Иерофей (Малицкий) (1727—1799), bishop of the Russian Orthodox Church, Metropolitan of Kiev and Galicia, Bishop of Chernigov and Nizhyn
- ru:Иерофей (Померанцев) (1880—1942), Renovated Church metropolitan of Kazan and Sviyazh
- ru:Иерофей (Прилуцкий) (1682—1728), archimandrite of the Russian Orthodox Church
- ru:Иерофей (Соболев) (1936—2001) bishop of the Russian Orthodox Church, bishop of Balakhna, vicar of the Nizhny Novgorod diocese
