= Jesus Hominum Salvator (Ritzos) =

Painting by Andreas Ritzos

- Ἰησοῦς Ἡμέτερος Σωτήρ (Greek), Iesus Hominum Salvator (Latin)
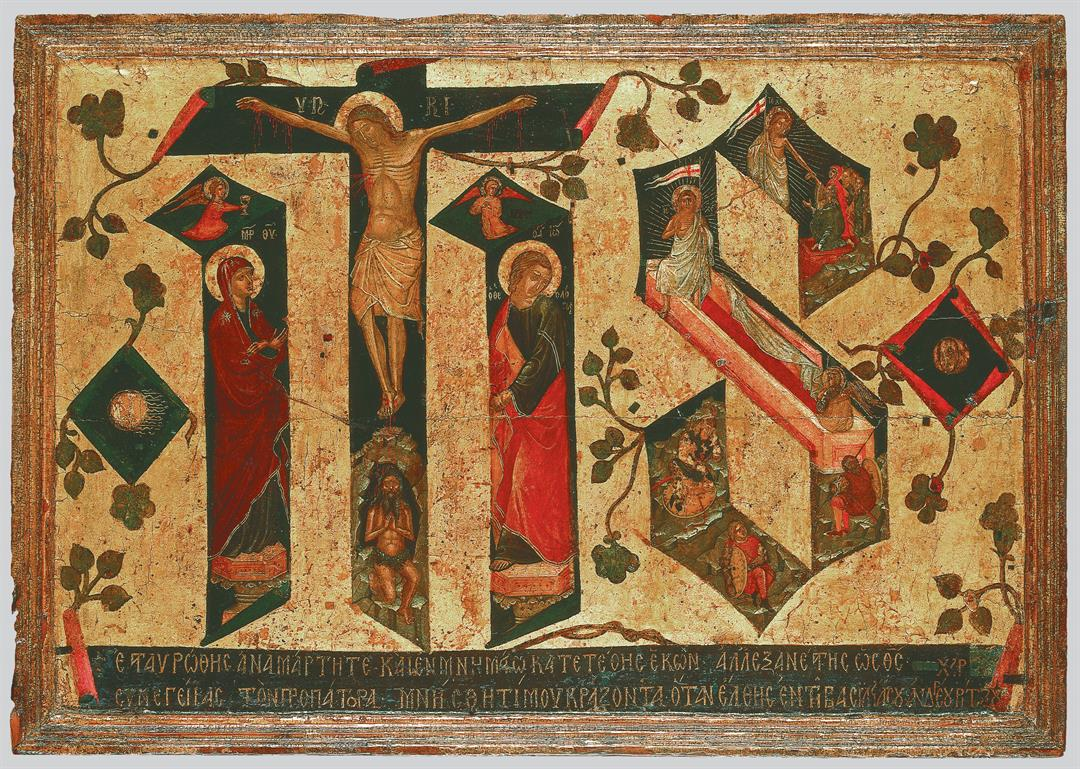
- Artist: Andreas Ritzos
- Year: 1436-1492
- Medium: tempera on wood
- Movement: Cretan School
- Subject: Christogram IHS
- Dimensions: 44.5 cm × 63.5 cm (17.5 in × 25 in)
- Location: Byzantine and Christian Museum, Athens, Greece
- Owner: Byzantine and Christian Museum
- Accession: ΒΧΜ 01549
- Website: Official Website

Jesus Hominum Salvator (Latin for Jesus, Savior of Humankind) is a tempera painting by Andreas Ritzos. Ritzos was one of the founders of the Cretan School of painting. His teacher was Angelos Akotantos. Andreas Ritzos was active from 1436 to 1492. He painted in the traditional Greek-Italian Byzantine style combined with Italian Renaissance Venetian painting. The technique later became known as the maniera greca. Sixty of his works survived.

Symbols and abbreviations have been a fundamental part of the Christian religion. Both Greek and Italian artists developed a pictorial representation of theological subjects. The Christogram is one of the earliest symbols of the faith. Roman Emperor Constantine implemented the symbol Chi Rho as part of his military insignia. The Greek letters Chi Rho are the first two letters in the Greek spelling of Christ ΧΡΙΣΤΟΣ pronounced Christos. The vertical stroke of the rho intersects the center of the chi.

Another important Christogram evolved during the Byzantine Empire. The name is derived from the first three letters of Jesus's name in Greek ΙΗΣΟΥΣ pronounced Iésous. The Latinized version of the letters IHS (Iesus Hominum Salvator) were extremely popular during Byzantine times. The Latin version means Jesus Savior of Humankind. Another version was In Hoc Signo (In this sign). Ἰησούς Ἡμέτερος Σωτήρ (Jesus Our Savior) is another usage of the three Greek letters ΙΗΣ.

IHS became the official Christogram of the Jesuit Order during the fifteenth century. The symbol is used on the coat of arms of Pope Francis. Greek painter Andreas Ritzos used the Christogram IHS in one of his most important icons. The painter added the crucifixion and the resurrection within the letters of the Christogram. The icon was first mentioned in the will of Cretan scholar and noble Andreas Kornaros in 1611. He bequeathed the painting to an important individual in Venice. In more recent years, the painting became part of the collection of the Byzantine and Christian Museum in Athens, Greece.

== Description ==
The materials used were egg tempera paint and gold leaf on a wood panel. The height of the painting is 44.5 cm (17.5 in) and the width is 63.5 cm (25 in). The work is dated between 1440 and 1492. The painting is unique because artists rarely used Christogram symbols in fine art paintings. To the left and right of the image two spheres appear within diamond-shaped symbols. The sphere to our left is the sun and on our right, the moon appears. Both planetary figures are painted in detail. The Christogram features the crucifixion in the letters I and H. The Virgin Mary appears within the letter I. She stands on a pedestal weeping the crucifixion. The garment of the celestial figure is painted in the traditional Byzantine style. Above the Virgin appears an angel with a cup. The angel is about to collect the blood seeping out of the wounded Christ figure. A similar angel appears in Pavias's Crucifixion collecting the blood of Christ. The part of the H with the body of Christ is folded on the top edges. The figure follows Italian-Greek Byzantine prototypes. Within the same letter of the Christogram below the crucified body appears the ancient biblical figure Adam. He stands outside of a cave. In the next portion of the letter H John the Evangelist appears in his traditional position as part of the crucifixion sequence. He stands on a similar pedestal as the Virgin Mary as he looks away.

Within the final letter S of the Christogram, in the lower portion of the letter, three guards are dumbfounded at the heavenly escape of the resurrected figure. The guards hold shields the guard closest to the angel also holds a sphere while he sits on a rock. The artist elegantly creates a visual space within the letter. The sarcophagus illustrates deeper space clear diagonal lines and the holy towel is weightless in a spaceless setting. An angel sits over the entire scene at the lower portion of the sarcophagus. A bright radiant aura surrounds the resurrected figure. In a scene to our right in the upper most portion of the letter S. The resurrected figure embraces a group of biblical figures. The entire icon is covered with beautiful vines. The Greek inscription below reads ΈΣΤΑΥΡΩΘΗΣ ΑΝΑΜΑΡΤΗΤΕ ΚΑΙ ΕΝ ΜΝΗΜΕΙΩ ΚΑΤΕΤΕΘΗΣ ΕΚΩΝ ΑΛΛ'ΕΞΑΝΕΣΤΗΣ ΩΣ ΘΕΟΣ ΣΥΝΕΓΕΙΡΑΣ ΤΟΝ ΠΡΟΠΑΤΟΡΑ ΜΝΗΣΘΗΤΙ ΜΟΥ ΚΡΑΖΟΝΤΑ ΟΤΑΝ ΕΛΘΗΣ ΕΝ ΤΗ ΒΑΣΙΛΕΙΑ ΣΟΥ (You were crucified without sin, you were willingly placed in a tomb but you were resurrected as God with the aid of the ancestors possibly Adam, remember me I cry, when you enter your kingdom.)

== Gallery ==
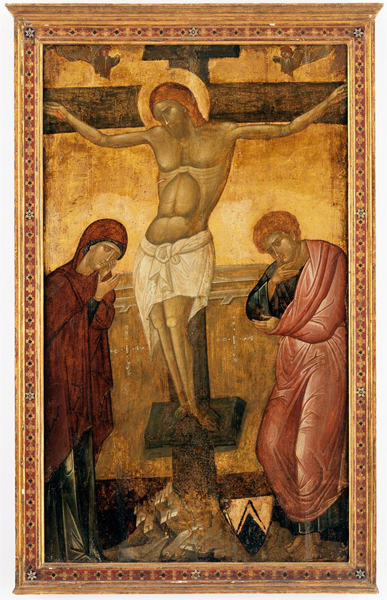
Greek-Italian Byzantine Crucifixion

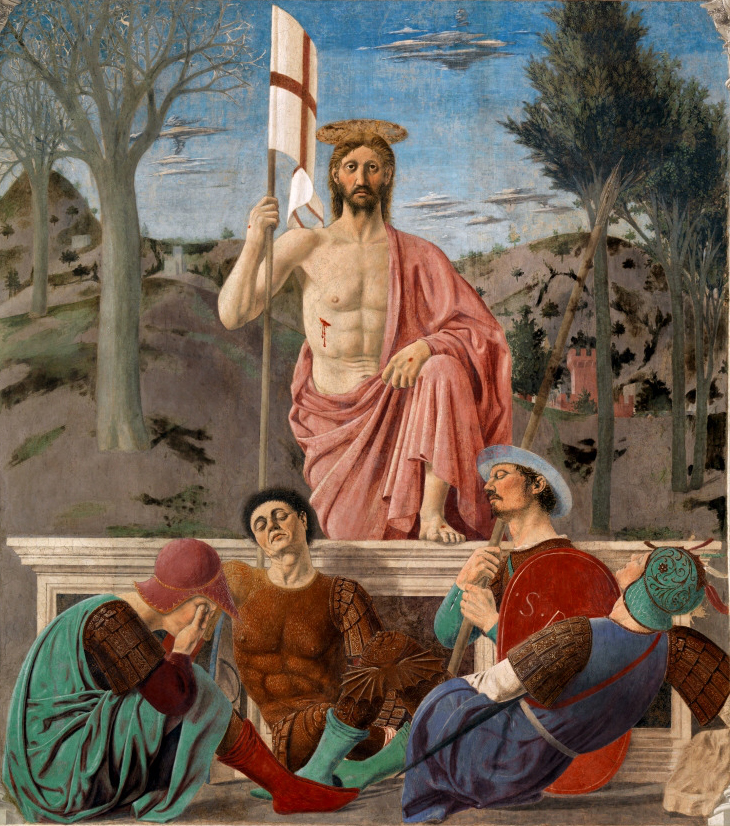
Resurrection Piero della Francesca
