= Jerotej =

Jerotej (Serbian: Йеротей) is a Serbian given name, an equivalent of Greek Hierotheos. Notable people with the name include:

- Jerotej Račanin, Serbian writer and transcriber of church manuscripts and books
- Jerotej Sokolović, archbishop of the Serbian Patriarchate of Peć and the Serbian patriarch
