= Andreas Ritzos =

Greek icon painter (1421–1492)

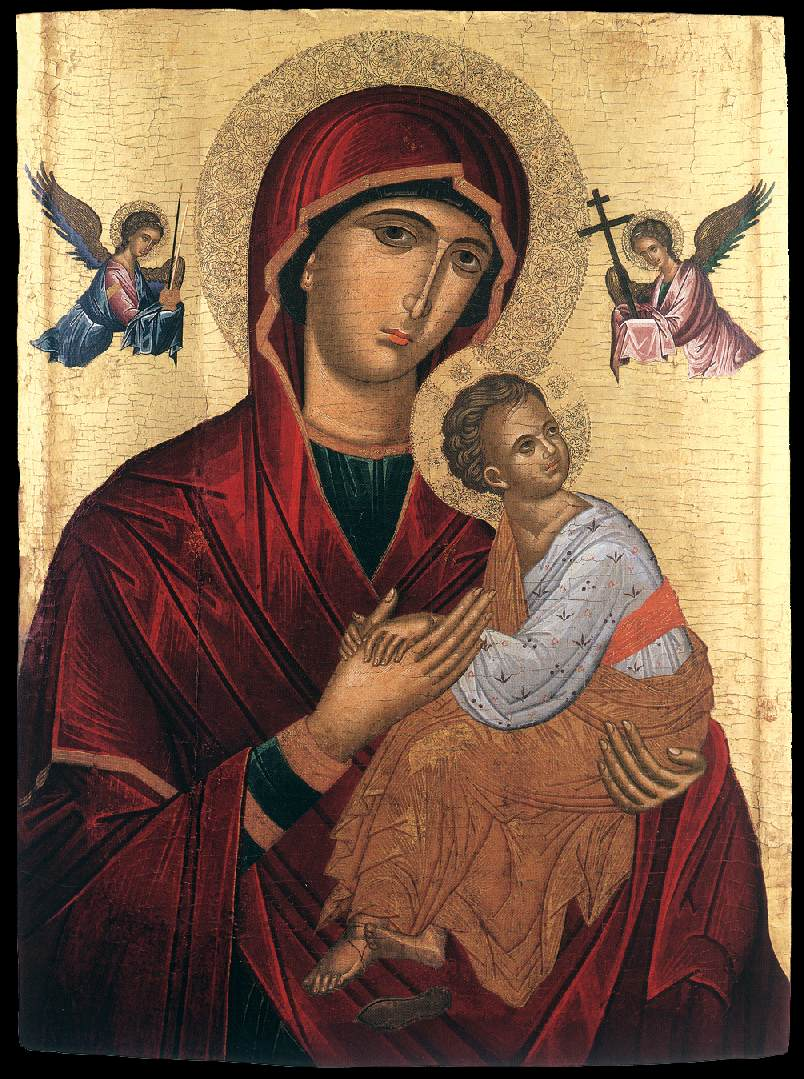
- The Mother of God of Passion
- Born: 1421; Iraklio, Crete
- Died: 1492; Crete
- Movement: Cretan school
- Spouses: Maria, Nicola Gritti
- Children: Nikolaos Ritzos

Andreas Ritzos (Greek: Ανδρέας Ρίτζος; 1421—1492; also spelled Rico, Ricio or Rizo) was a Greek icon painter from Crete. Ritzos is considered one of the founding fathers of the Cretan school. He was affiliated with Angelos Akotantos. Most of his work stylistically follows the traditional maniera greca. His children, grandchildren, and great-grandchildren were also painters. He was one of the most influential painters of the Cretan school along with Andreas Pavias and Angelos Akotantos. He influenced the works of Georgios Klontzas, Nikolaos Tzafouris, Theophanes the Cretan, Michael Damaskinos and El Greco. According to the Institute for Neohellenic Research, sixty of his paintings have survived.

== Biography ==
Andreas Ritzos was born in Iraklio. His father Nicholas Ritzo was a seaman and jeweler, and his mother was lady Ergina. Andreas married Maria and had two sons. His son Nicholas was a painter. His other son Thomas was a jeweler and painter. His grandson was painter Maneas Ritzos.

Andreas is listed as a painter for the first time on July 27, 1451 as Andreas Ritzos pinctor. Records indicate that in 1454 his co-worker Maneas Theologitis vouched for him. Documents indicate he was active as a painter between 1460 and 1492. He was also associated with other painters namely George Pelergi and Ioanni Kappadoka. In one document he testifies to the delivery of items from John Akatanos and in another, he received a loan from Andreas Pavias. His wife Maria died around 1482. He split the inheritance with his son Nicholas. His second marriage was with Nicola Gritti of Agnese. He signed his paintings three different ways; five of his icons were signed in Greek χείρ Ανδρέα Ρέτζου, three were signed Andreas Rico de Candia pinxit, and finally one was signed Andreas Ricio de Candia.

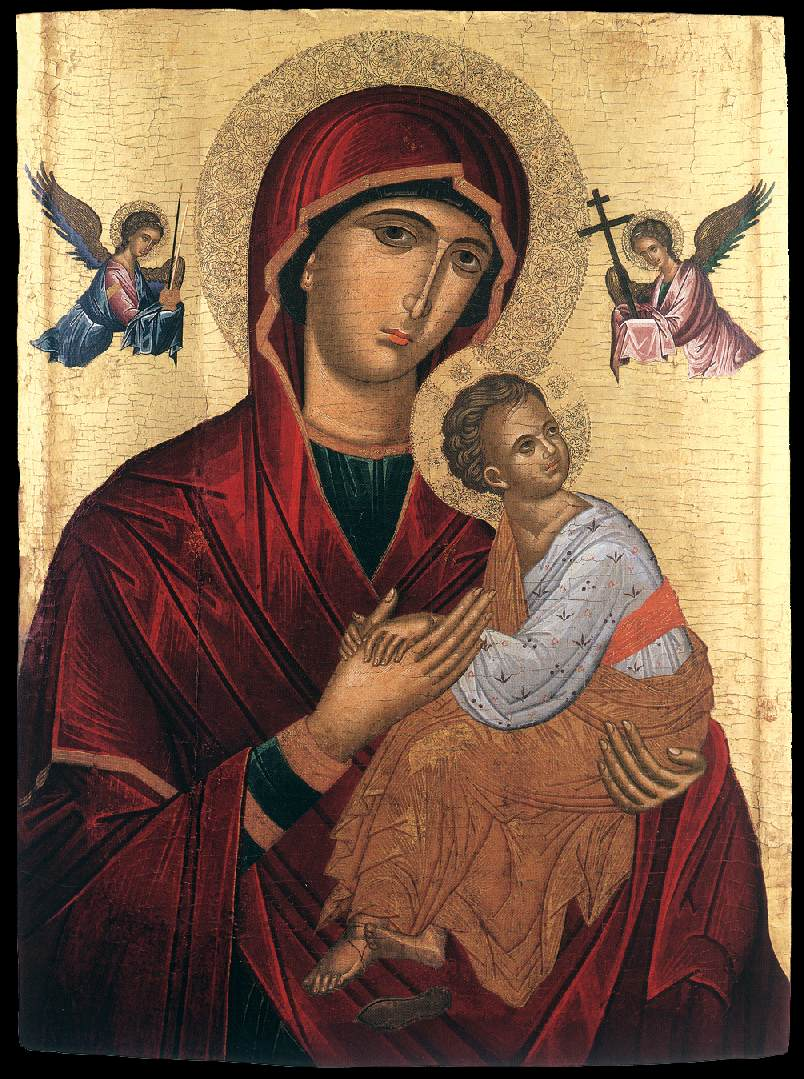
Virgin and Child Andreas Ritzos

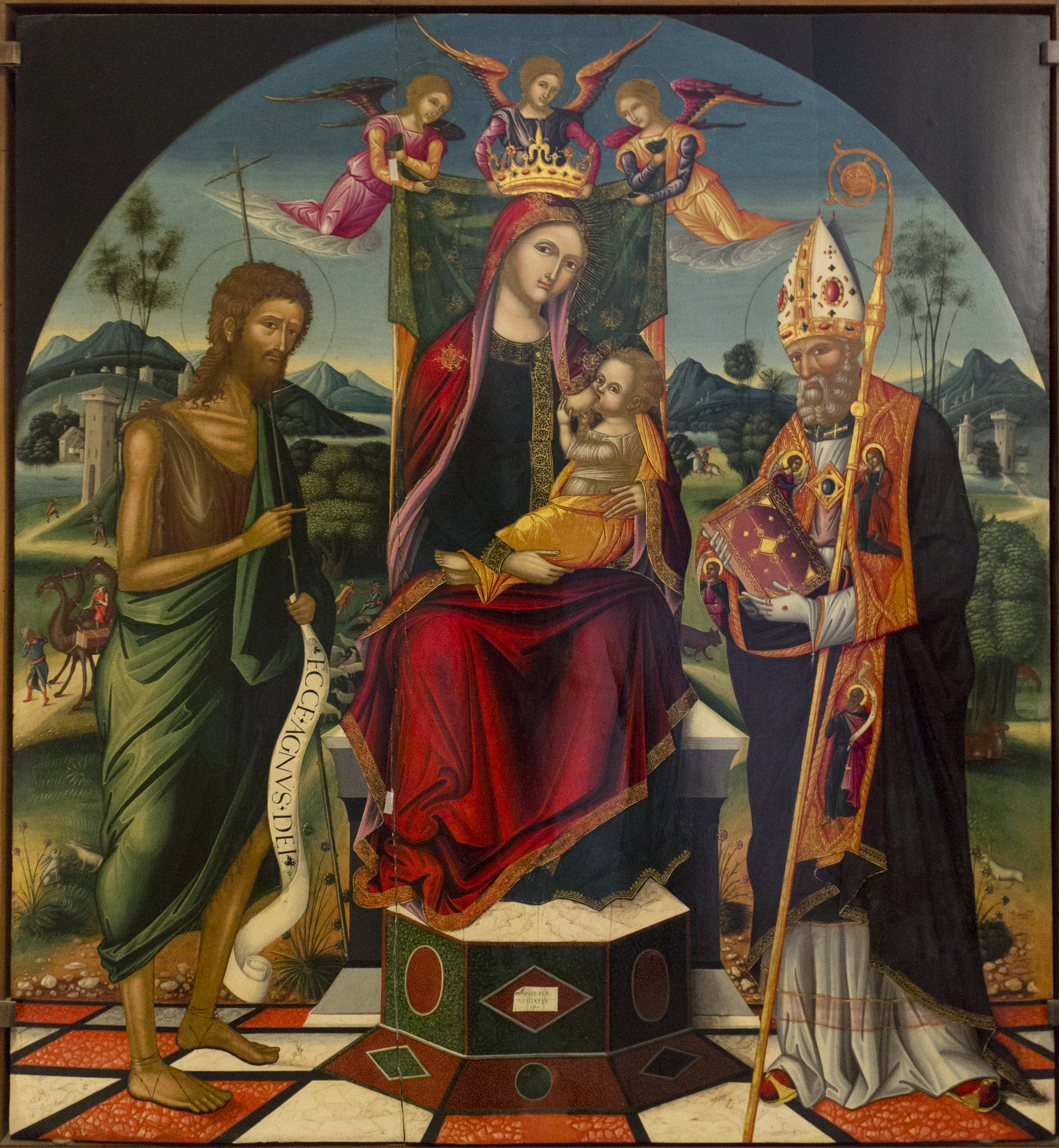
Madonna and Child enthroned Ioannis Permeniates

A significant amount of Madonna and Child paintings by Andreas Ritzos survived. Many painters chose the subject matter but Duccio, Cimabue, Fra Angelico, and Giotto di Bondone employed a similar mannerism exemplifying the maniera greca. Most artists of the Cretan school began to employ some attributes of the Venetian school. One greek artist of Venice Ioannis Permeniates completely adopted a new style of painting which was in line with the Venetian school.

Ritzos popularity shows that both Italian and Greek patrons continued to value the maniera greca and preferred the traditional style. Many paintings were attributed to the school of Ritzos because they were not signed and resemble the artist's painting style. There were countless Madonna and Child paintings for comparison. Angelos Akotantos influenced Andreas Pavias and Andreas Ritzos. Andreas Pavias and Ritzos influenced each other both employ the traditional rich gold background but Pavias began to employ the Venetian school.

The Virgin and Child with Crucifixion Narrative and the Ascension of Christ in the gallery are precursors to Georgios Klontzas and Theodore Poulakis All Creation rejoices in Thee. Andreas Pavias Crucifixion of Jesus is another popular work that influenced Georgios Klontzas and Theodore Poulakis All Creation rejoices in Thee. Ritzos Ascension of Christ separates the scenes into different compartments while Andreas Pavias Crucifixion of Jesus utilizes countless figures. Georgios Klontzas Transfiguration and Monastic Scenes 1603, is similar to Ritzos Acension of Christ.

== Gallery ==
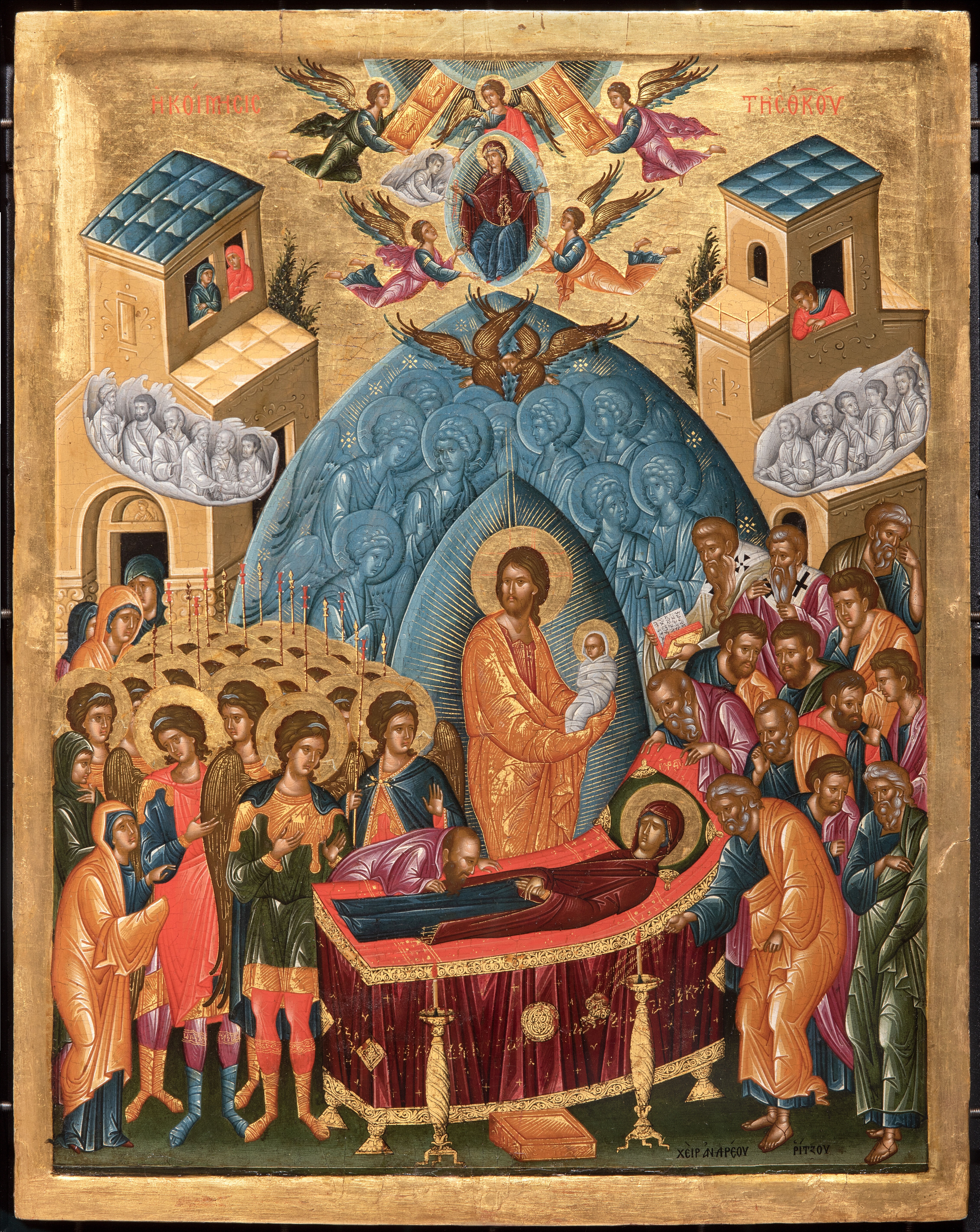
The Dormition of the Virgin

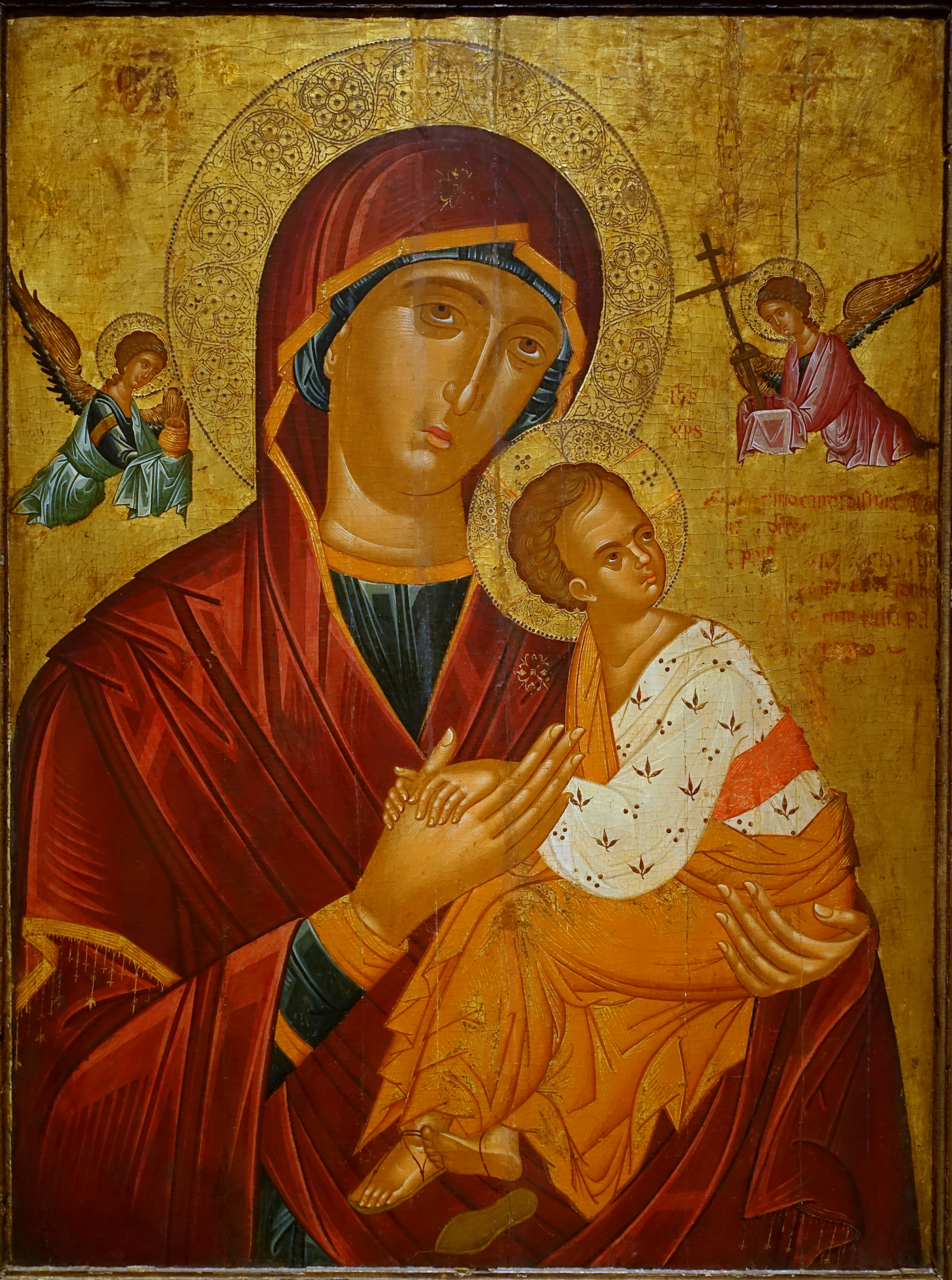
Mother and Child

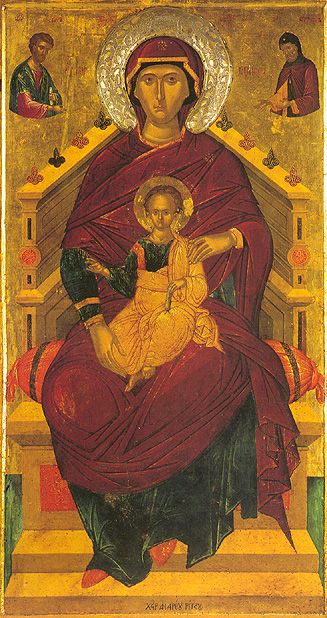
The Mother of God Enthroned

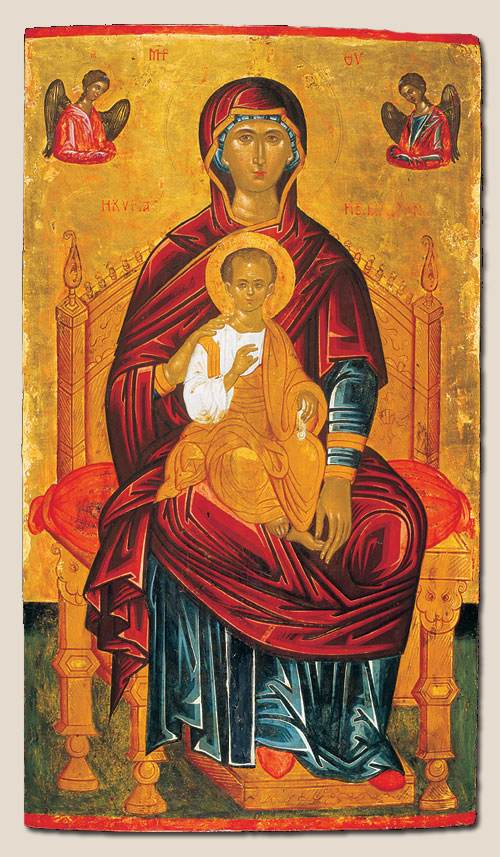
The Mother of God Enthroned

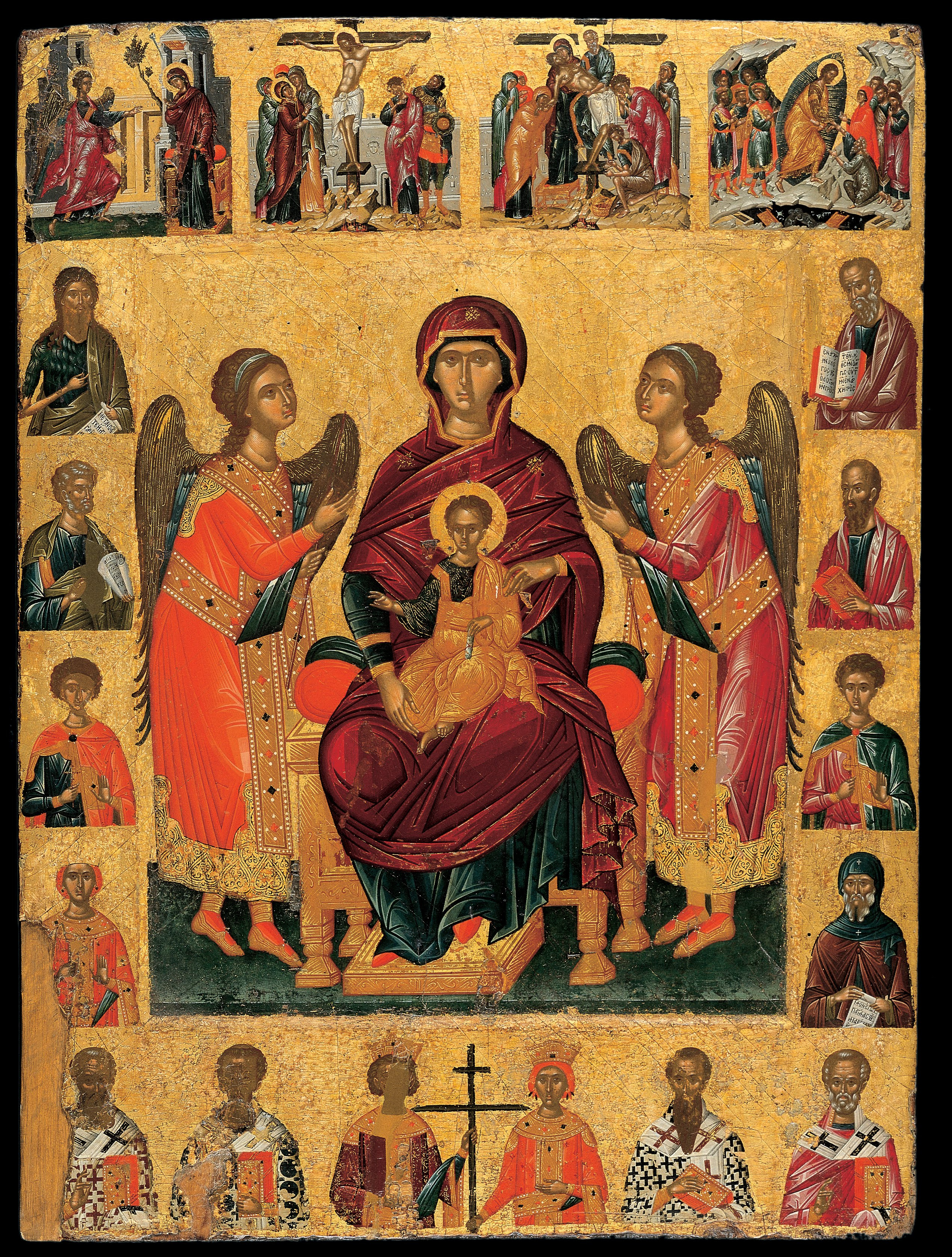
The Virgin and Child with Crucifixion Narrative

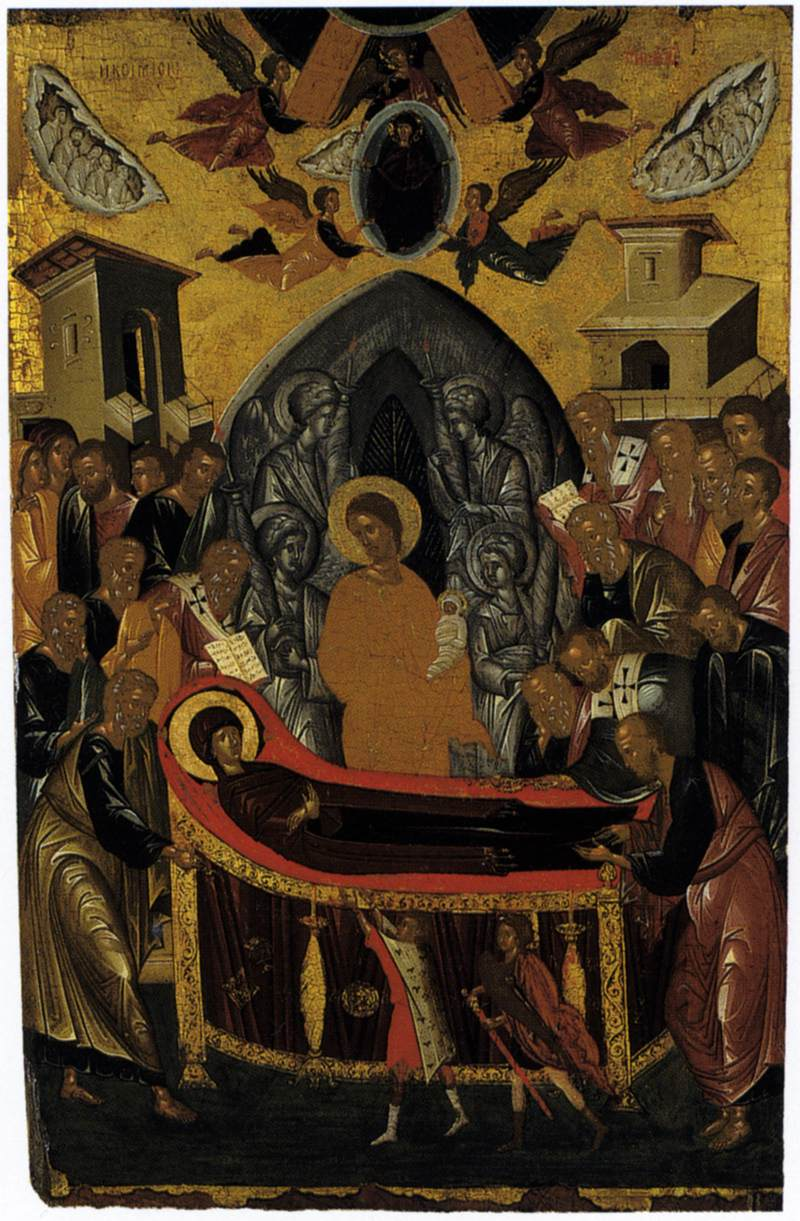
The Dormition of the Virgin

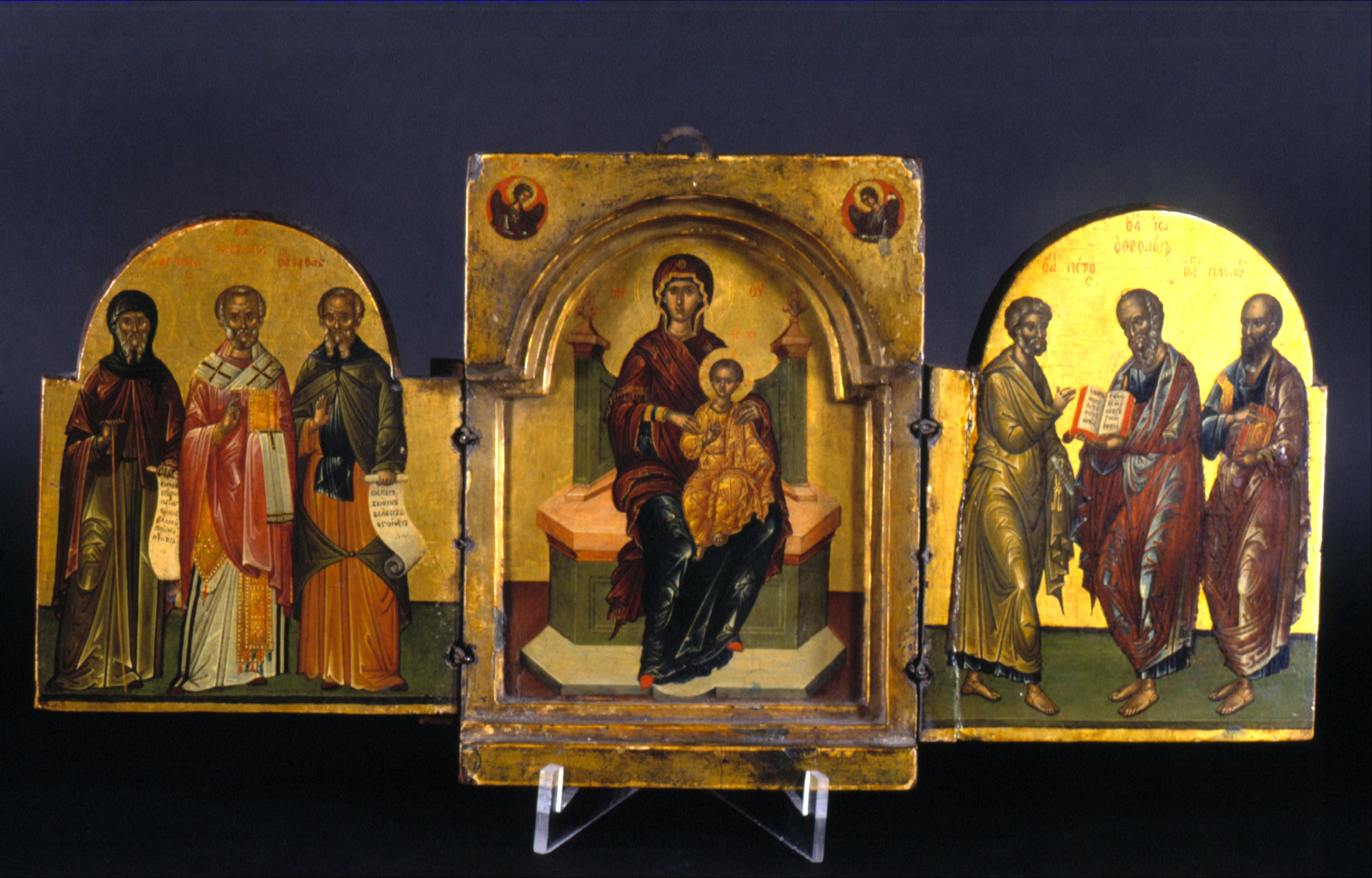
Triptych Left to Right, Saint Nicholas with Saints, Virgin and Child, Saint Nicholas with Saints

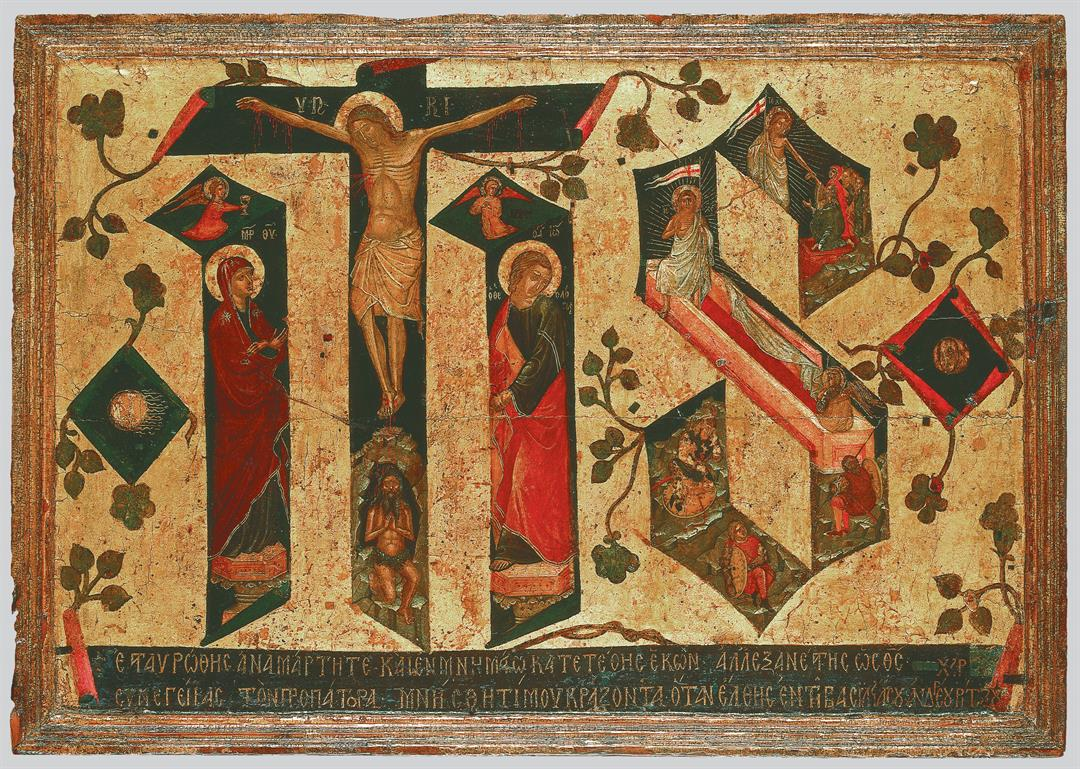
Crucifixion and Resurrection Scenes within a Christogram

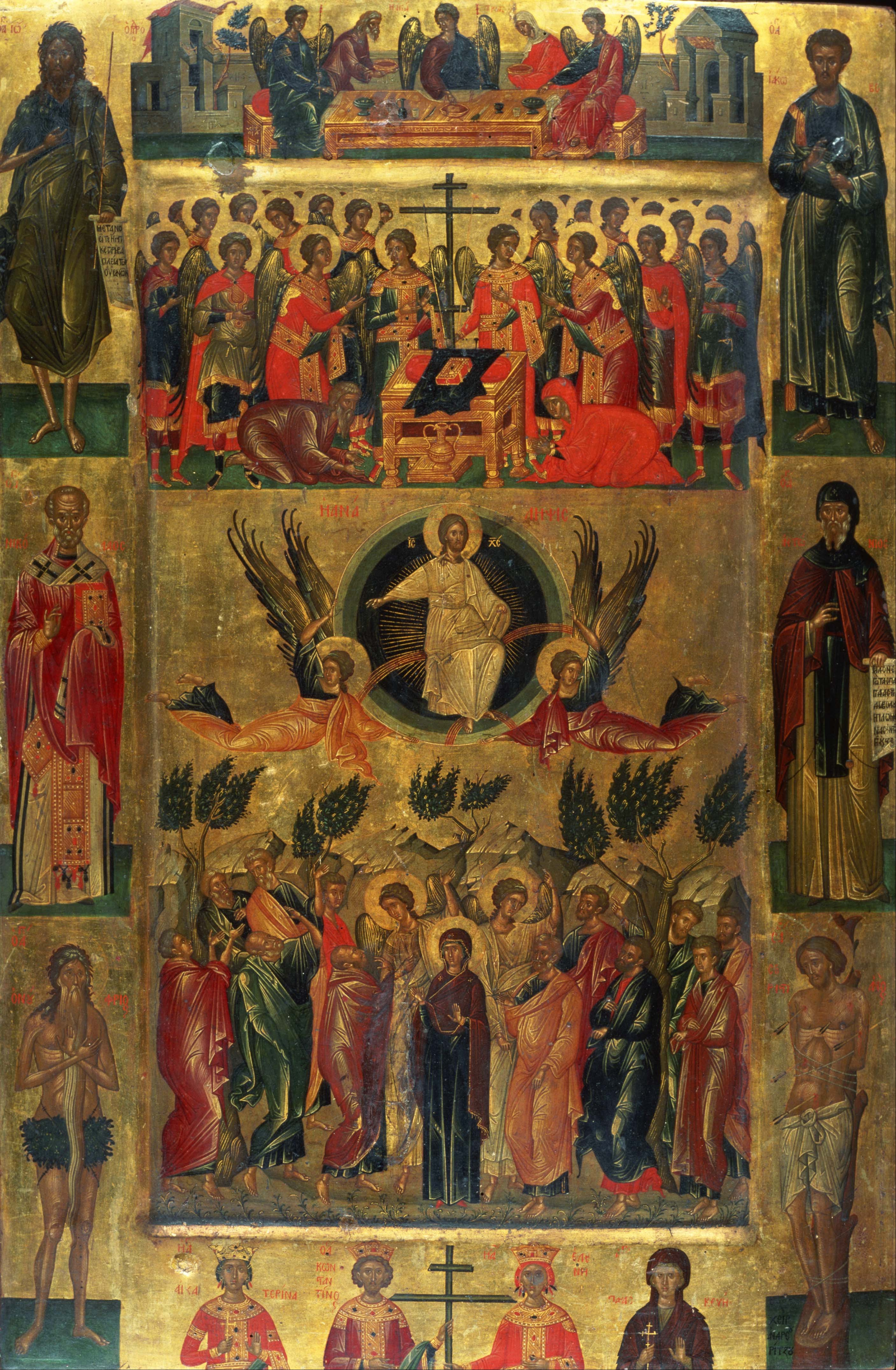
Ascension of Christ

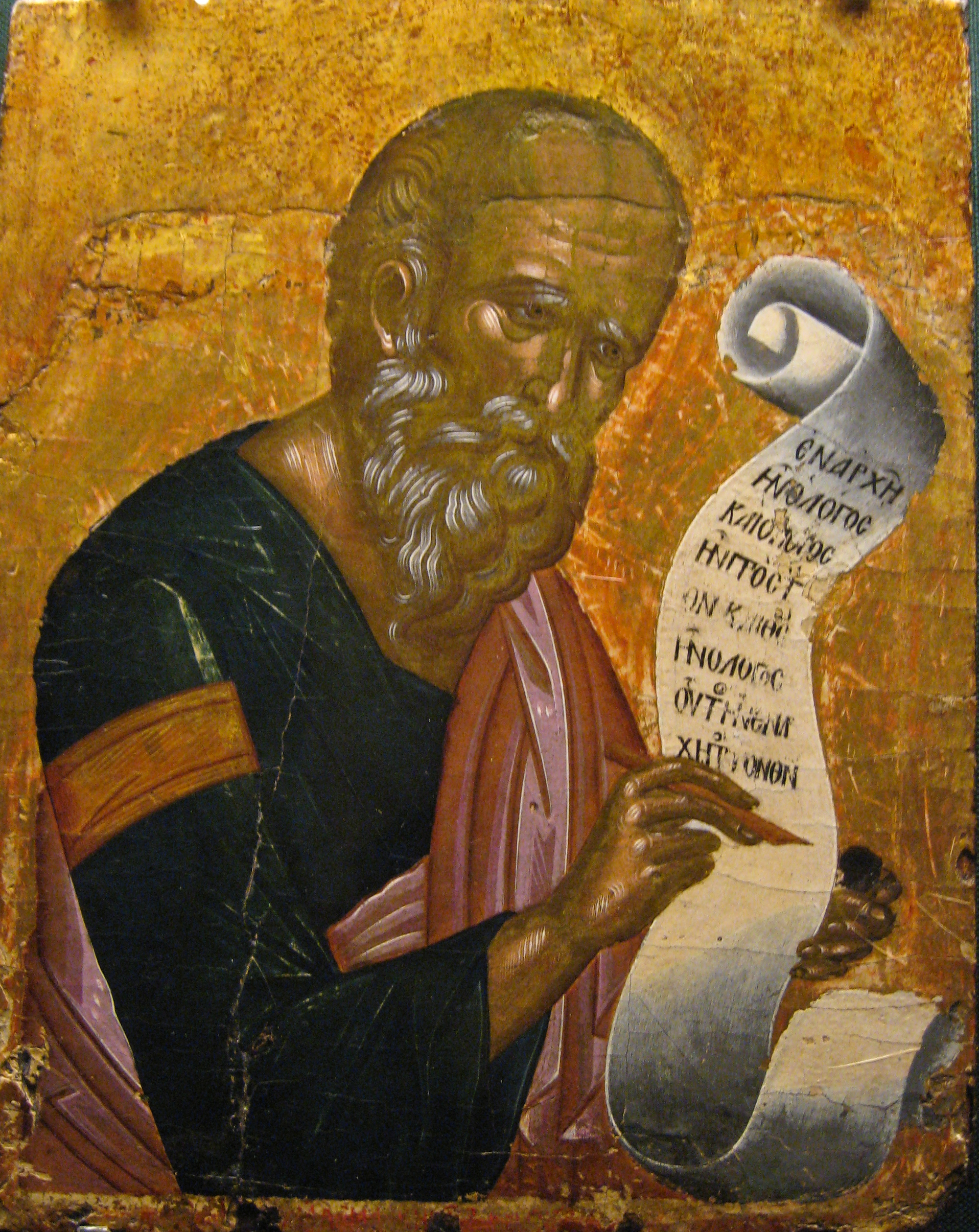
Saint John the Theologian

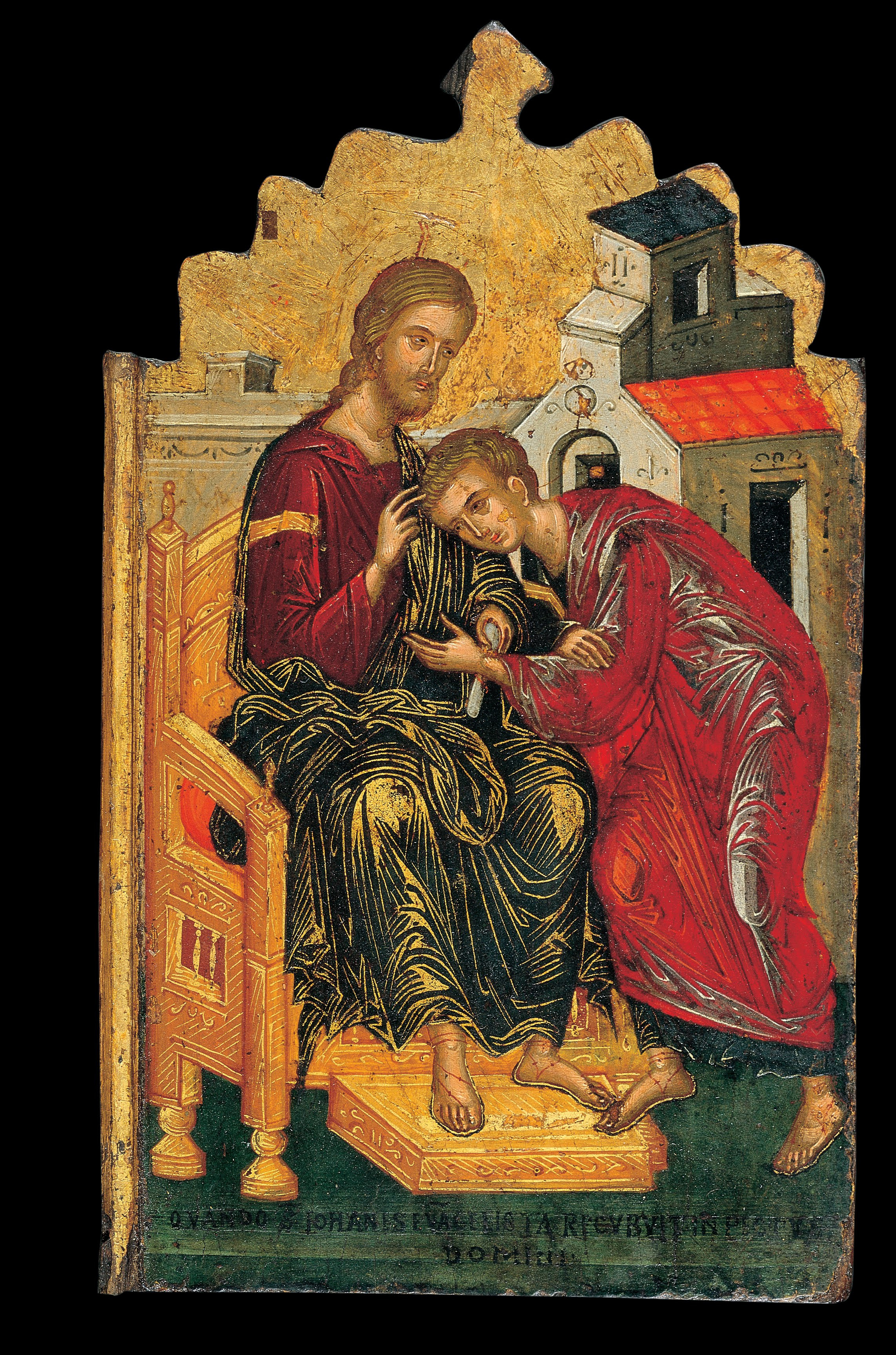
Scene from the Life of St John the Divine

=== Italian Style ===
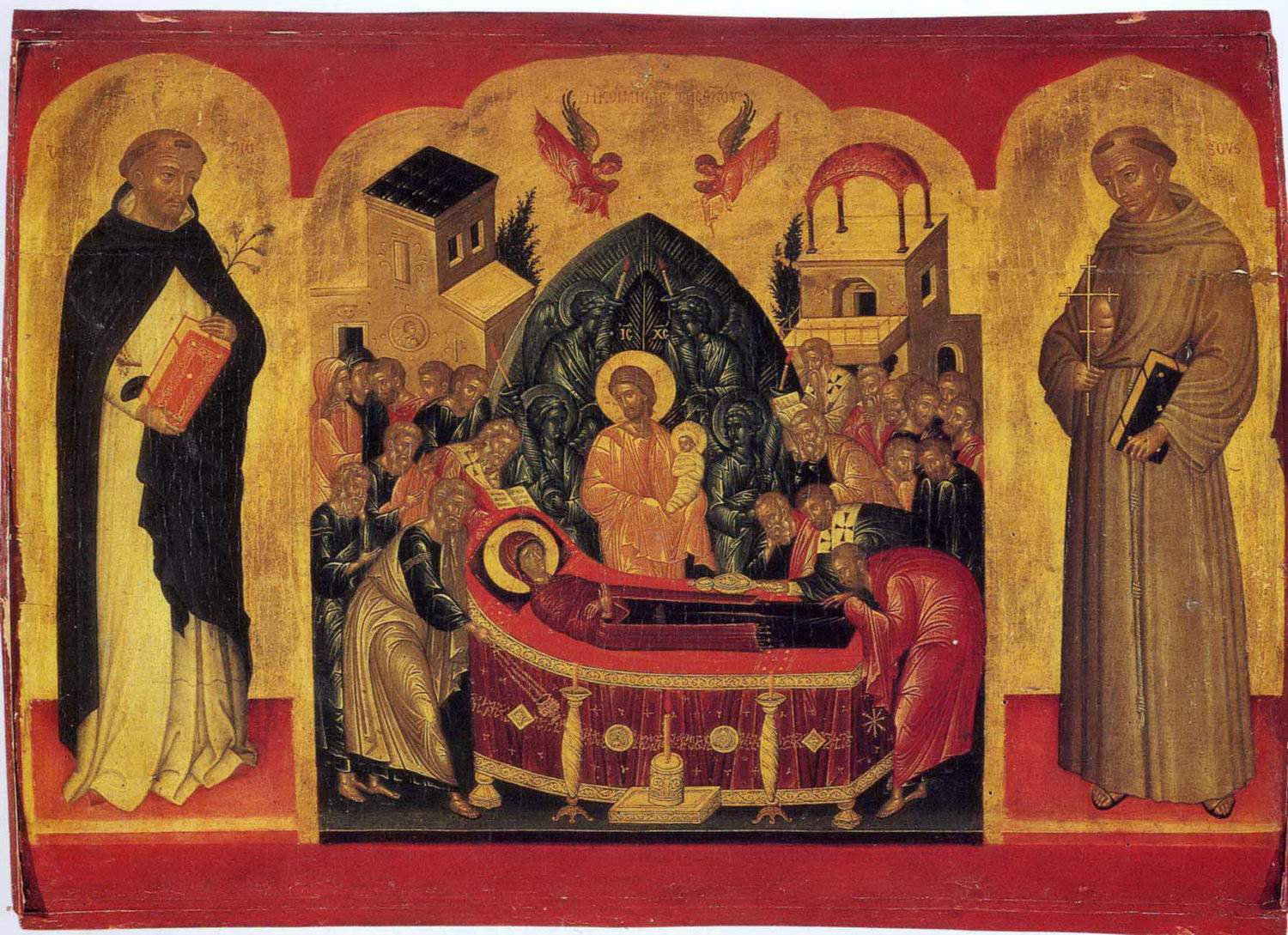
Dormition of Mary with Francis and Dominic

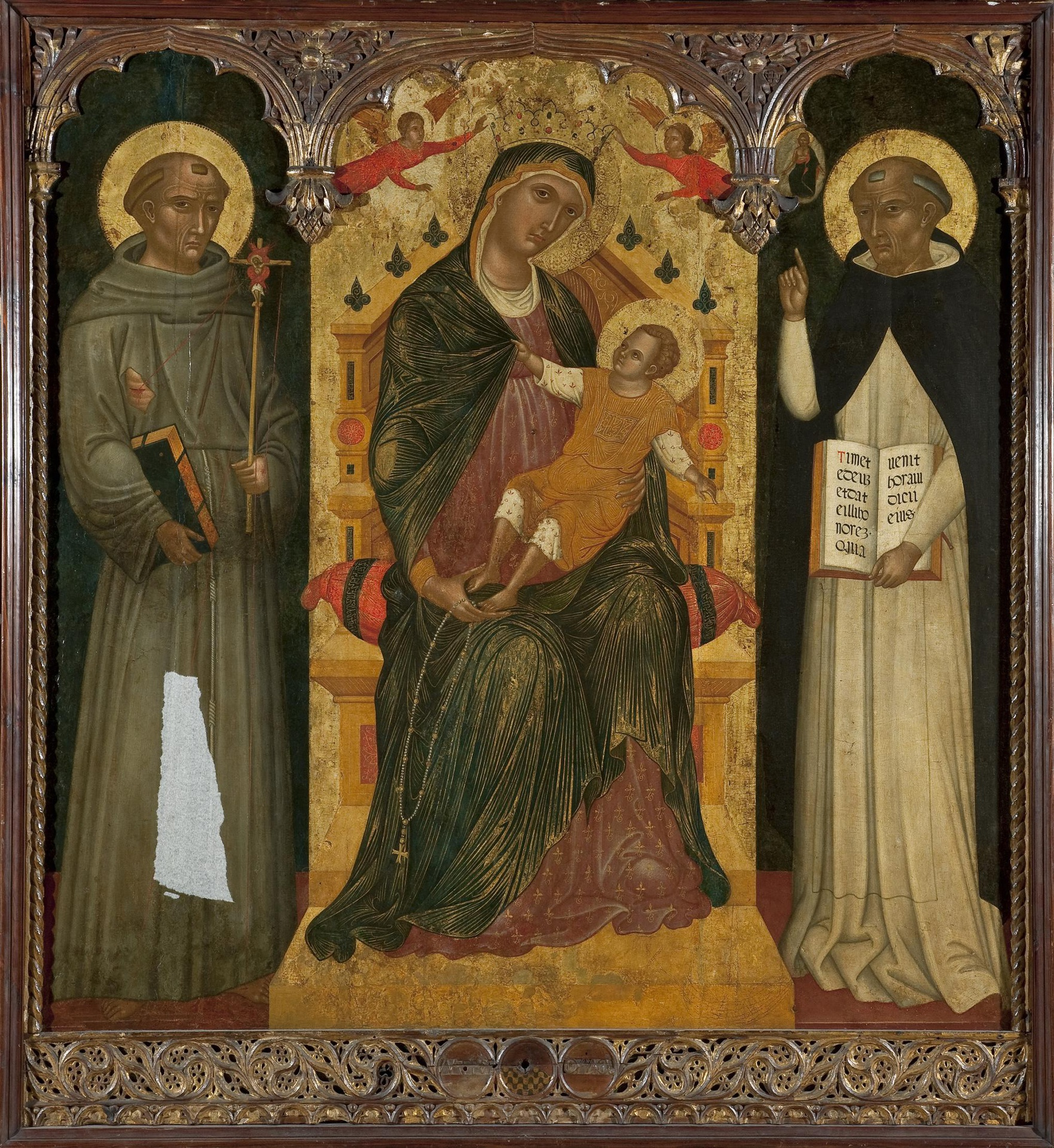
Madonna with Saints

== See also ==
- Jesus Hominum Salvator (Ritzos)
- The Virgin Pantanassa (Ritzos)
- The Dormition of the Virgin (Ritzos)
