= Dormition of the Virgin (El Greco) =

Painting by El Greco

The Dormition of the Virgin
- Η κοίμηση της Θεοτόκου (Greek), El tránsito de la Virgen (Spanish)
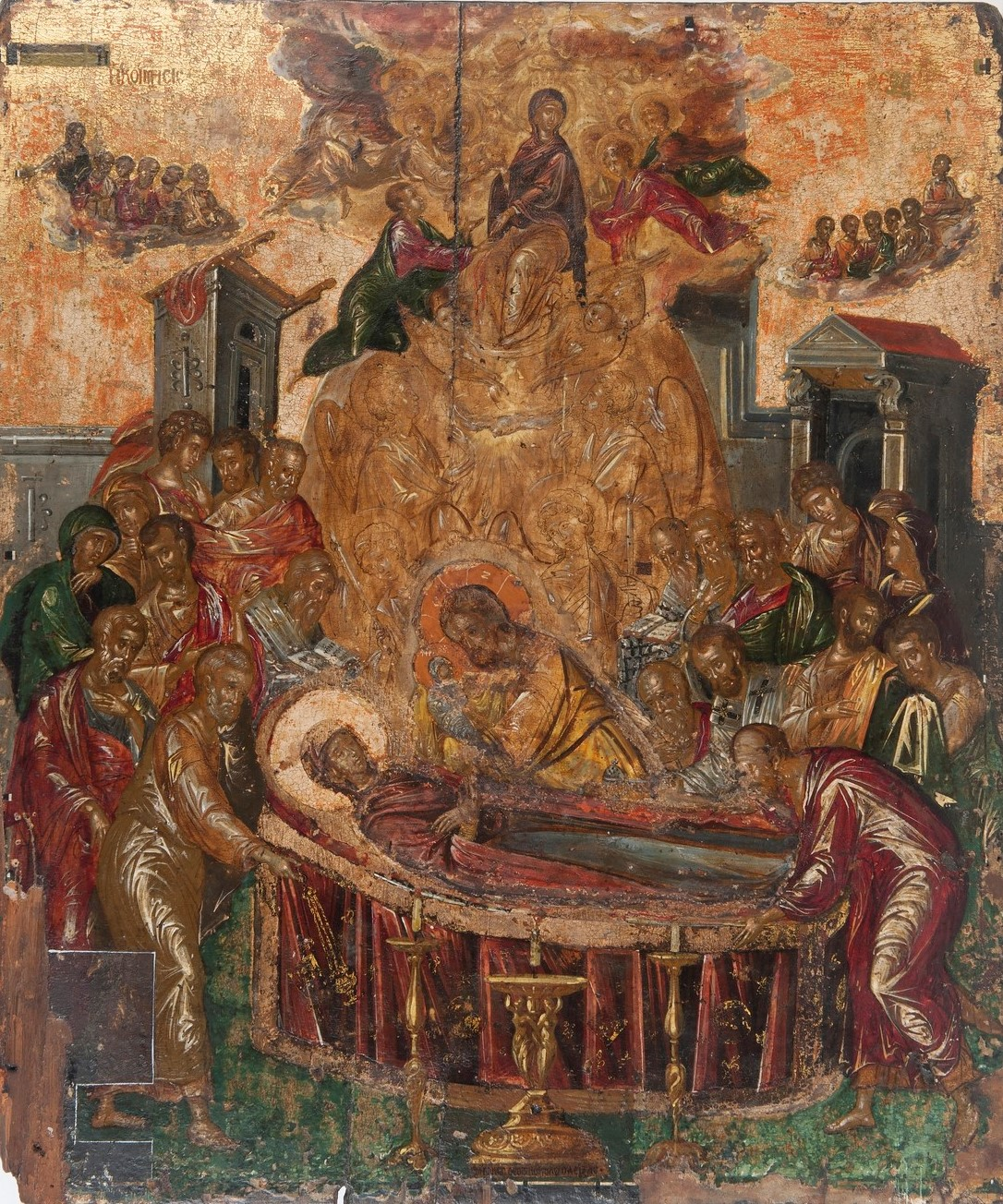
- Artist: El Greco
- Year: 1565–1566
- Type: Tempera and gold on panel
- Movement: Cretan School
- Dimensions: 61.4 cm × 45 cm (24.2 in × 18 in)
- Location: Holy Cathedral of the Dormition of the Virgin, Hermoupolis

Dormition of the Virgin is a tempera painting on panel executed by El Greco near the end of his Cretan period, probably before 1567. El Greco's signature on the base of the central candelabrum was discovered in 1983. The discovery of the Dormition led to the attribution of three other signed works of "Doménicos" to El Greco (Modena Triptych, St. Luke Painting the Virgin and Child, and The Adoration of the Magi) and then to the acceptance as authentic of more works, signed or not (such as The Passion of Christ (Pietà with Angels), painted in 1566).

This discovery constituted a significant advance in the understanding of El Greco's formation and early career. The painting combines post-Byzantine and Italian mannerist stylistic and iconographic elements. El Greco is now seen as an artist with a formative training on Crete; a series of works illuminate the style of early El Greco, some painted while he was still in Crete, some from his period in Venice, and some from his subsequent stay in Rome.

The icon, which retains its function as an object of veneration in the Church of the Dormition of the Virgin in Syros, was probably brought to the island during the Greek War of Independence. The icon conforms closely to the established pattern for this subject, which was very common in the Orthodox Church in which El Greco was raised and was influenced by. Nevertheless, it has lost some elements of the traditional Byzantine austerity, adopting traits of the Renaissance engravings.

The composition of the Burial of the Count of Orgaz has been closely related to the Byzantine iconography of the Dormition of the Theotokos. The examples that have been used to support this point of view have a close relationship with the icon of the Dormition by El Greco that was discovered in 1983 in the church of the same name in Syros. Marina Lambraki-Plaka believes that such a connection exists. Robert Byron, according to whom the iconographic type of the Dormition was the compositional model for The Burial of the Count of Orgaz, asserts that El Greco as a genuine Byzantine painter worked throughout his life with a repertoire of components and motifs at will, depending on the narrative and expressive requirements of the art.

== See also ==
- List of works by El Greco
- Cretan School
