= Hippolytus of Thebes =

Late 7th or early 8th century Byzantine author and chronicler

Hippolytus of Thebes was a Byzantine author of the late 7th or early 8th century. His Chronicle, preserved only in part, is an especially valuable source for New Testament chronology.

Preserved fragments are scattered in about 40 manuscripts, mostly dealing with the Holy Family. Thus, according to the Chronicle, Jesus was crucified in AD 30, and Mary, mother of Jesus lived for eleven years longer, dying in AD 41.

The Chronicle is cited twice in the "short chronological notes" compiled under Constantine V (r. 741–775). Epiphanius the Monk, writing in the early 9th century, names Hippolytus as one of his authorities on the Life of the Blessed Virgin. Another fragment reports that after the Ascension, Mary continued to live in Jerusalem in a house bought by John the Apostle with the inheritance from his father Zebedee. This tradition of a house of Mary in Jerusalem is first alluded to by Sophronius of Jerusalem (d. 638). Based on such evidence, the floruit of Hippolytus is placed roughly between AD 650 and 750.

The first edition of extant portions of the Chronicle was published by Emmanuel Schelstrate in 1692. The text was again edited by Migne in Patrologia Graeca (PG 117, col. 1025–1056). Two critical editions have been published by Diekamp in German (1898) and Curtin in English (2023) .

== External Sources ==
- Curtin, D.P. Fragments of 'Chronicle', Dalcassian Publishing Company, Philadelphia, 2023 ISBN 9781960069603
