= Hierotheos the Thesmothete =

Eastern Orthodox bishop and saint

Saint Hierotheos the Thesmothete
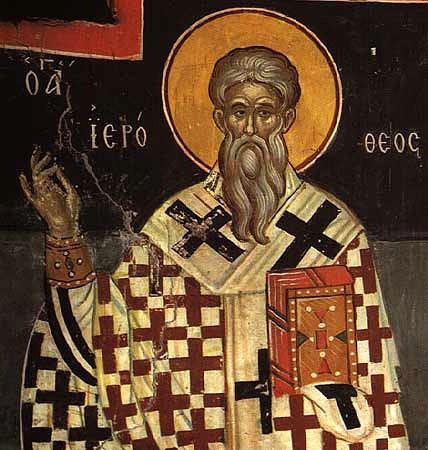
- Hierotheos the Thesmothete, by Theophanes the Greek, in Saint Nicholas Anapafsas Monastery, Meteora, Greece

Bishop of Athens
- Born: 1st century AD
- Died: 1st century AD
- Venerated in: Eastern Orthodox Church; Eastern Catholic Churches; Armenian Apostolic Church
- Feast: October 4

Hierotheos the Thesmothete (Greek: Ἱερόθεος ὁ Θεσμοθέτης) is the reputed first head and bishop of the Christian Athenians. The title thesmothete means ruler, or junior archon, of Athens (literally "rule-setter").

== Biography ==
Little is known of Hierotheos (Ἰερόθεος "sanctified by God"); church tradition holds that he was one of the learned men in the city of Athens. He was instructed in Christianity by the Apostle Paul, who baptized and ordained him around the year 52 AD. Hierotheos frequently visited and instructed St Dionysius the Areopagite. There is disagreement as to whether Hierotheos was actually a priest or bishop; some traditions describe Dionysius as the first bishop of Athens.

According to Pseudo-Dionysius (On the Divine Names, 3:2), Hierotheos was an accomplished hymnographer:

"He was wholly transported, wholly outside himself and was so deeply absorbed in communion with the sacred things he celebrated in hymnology, that to all who heard him and saw him and knew him, and yet knew him not, he seemed to be inspired of God, a divine hymnographer."

In more recent years, some have pointed that the name 'Hierotheos' is unique in Greek literature, nor is included in the extremely wide list of proper name known from papyri. The only record of this name is found in a Greek inscription from Athens.

== Hierotheos and the Dormition of the Theotokos ==
Hierotheos stood in the midst of the apostles and comforted them with spiritual songs and hymns which he sang accompanied with musical instruments.

== See also ==
- Early centers of Christianity: Greece

Catholic Church titles
New creation	Bishop of Athens	Succeeded by Dionysius the Areopagite
