= The Crucifixion (Paleokapas) =

Painting by Konstantinos Paleokapas

Crucifixion
- Σταύρωση (Greek), Crocifissione di Gesù (Italian)
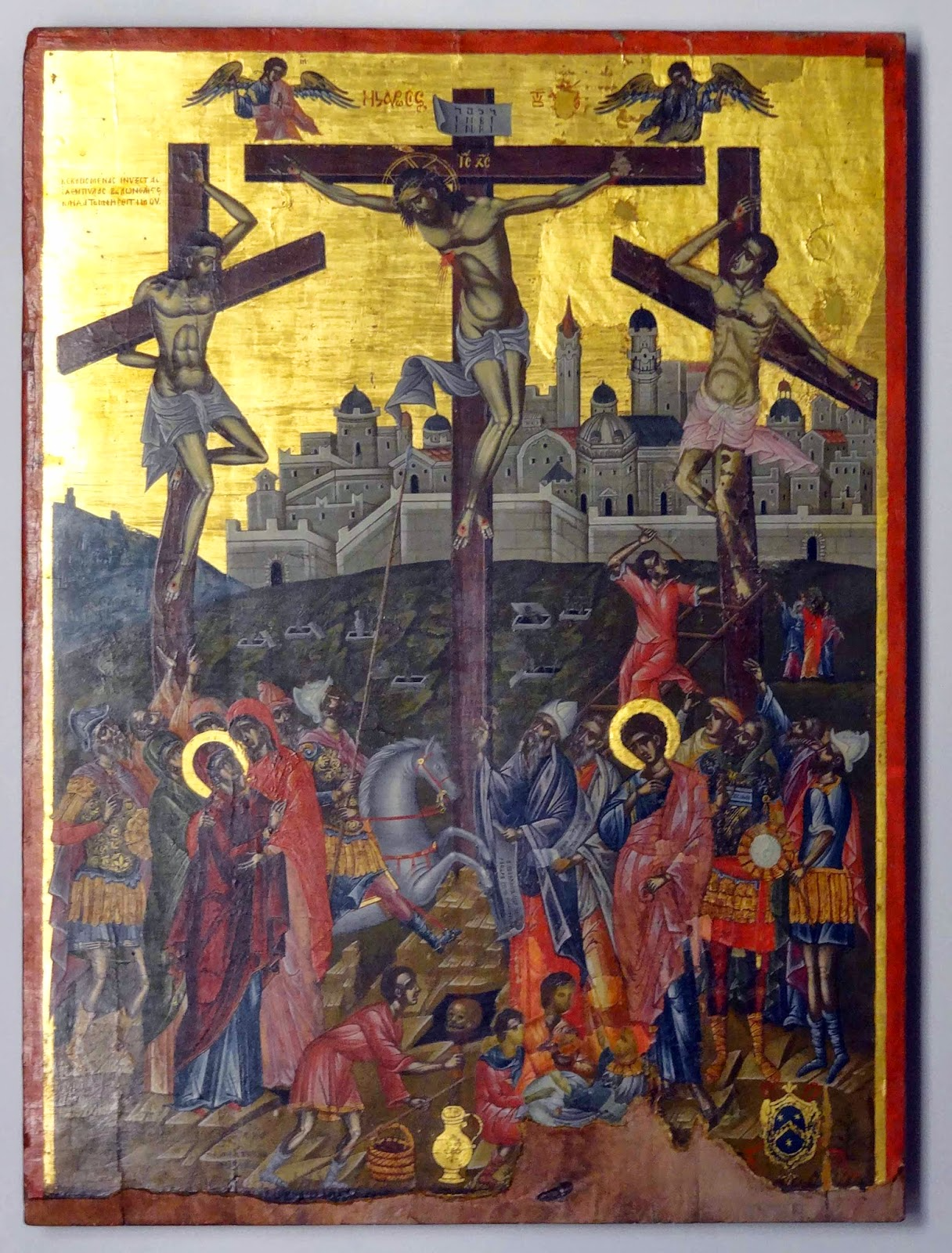
- Artist: Konstantinos Paleokapas
- Year: c. 1635–1640
- Medium: tempera on wood
- Movement: Late Cretan School
- Subject: Crucifixion of Jesus
- Dimensions: 117 cm × 73 cm (46 in × 28.7 in)
- Location: Gonia Monastery, Crete, Greece
- Owner: Gonia Monastery

The Crucifixion is a tempera painting by Konstantinos Paleokapas. Paleokapas was a Greek painter from the island of Crete. He was active during the early part of the 1600s. Six of his works survived, four are signed. The Crucifixion is one of the most popular events in human history. The scene has been duplicated countless times. Many crucifixion paintings were created by painters from the island of Crete. Some painters included El Greco, Andreas Pavias, Georgios Markazinis and Ioannis Moskos. Paleokapas created his own version of the popular subject. His crucifixion painting followed the prototype of many other paintings thematically. He added both the dice players and the resurrection of the dead. Andreas Pavias’s The Crucifixion (Pavias) and Margkazinis’s The Crucifixion (Margkazinis) both feature the popular pictorial representation of Mathews gospel. Paleokapas’s Crucifixion is located at the Gonia Monastery in Crete.

== Description ==
The painting is egg tempera and gold leaf on wood. The height is 117 cm (46 in) and Width is 73 cm (28.7 in). The three crosses and their orientation escape Andreas Pavias’s turned around impenitent thief. Both Theophanes the Cretan and Emmanuel Lambardos followed Pavias’s technique. Pavias led an artistic following with his unique depiction of the impenitent thief. Paleokapas’s Crucifixion is one of the simplest versions of the Cretan School. It follows the traditional prototype. Jerusalem is in the background.

The dead are rising right behind the crosses. The impenitent thief is to Jesus’s left and the penitent thief is to his right. A soldier is breaking the legs of the impenitent thief. Another soldier is about to kill Jesus with the sphere of destiny. The Virgin Mary is very sad she is embraced by Mary Magdalene. To the right of the cross John the Evangelist is present. A similar figure was painted in Margkazini’s Crucifixion behind the crosses. The figures' clothing and uniforms were influenced by a mixture of Venetian prototypes and 1st century standards. In the foreground, a man is trying to grab the attention of the gambling trio. Two angels appear above the cross. The cross also features a Greek inscription.

== Gallery ==
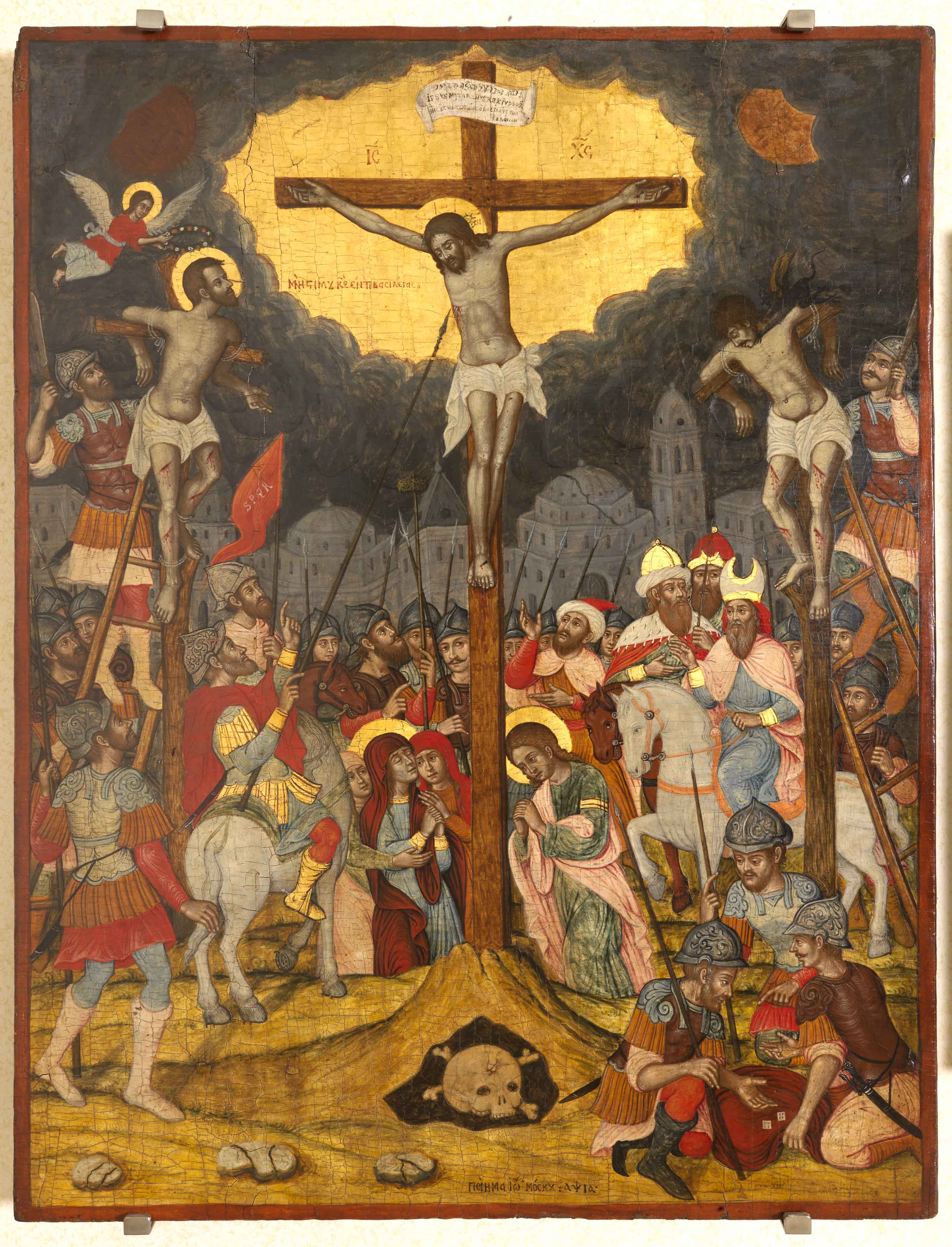
Crucifixion Moskos

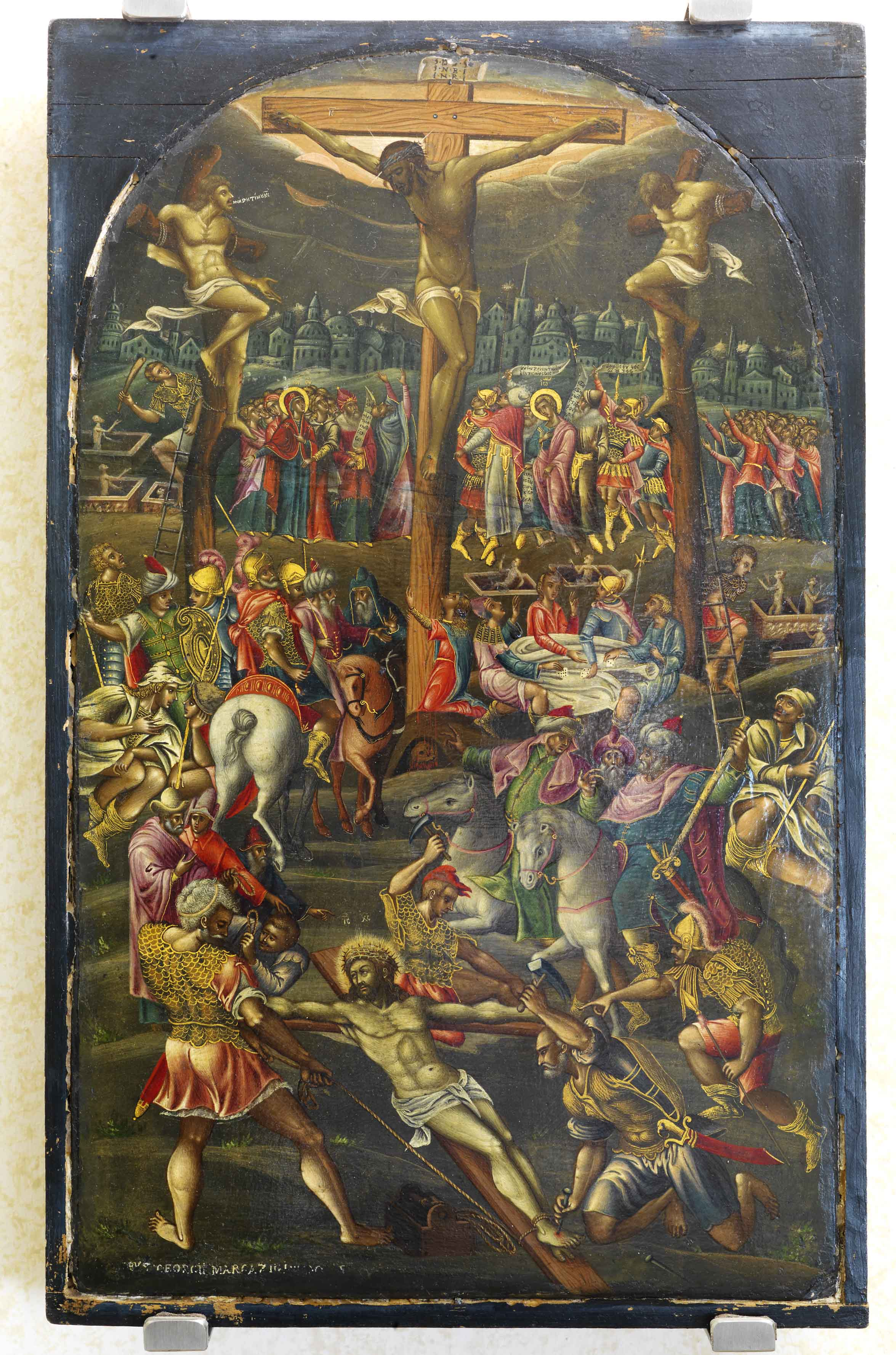
Crucifixion Markazinis

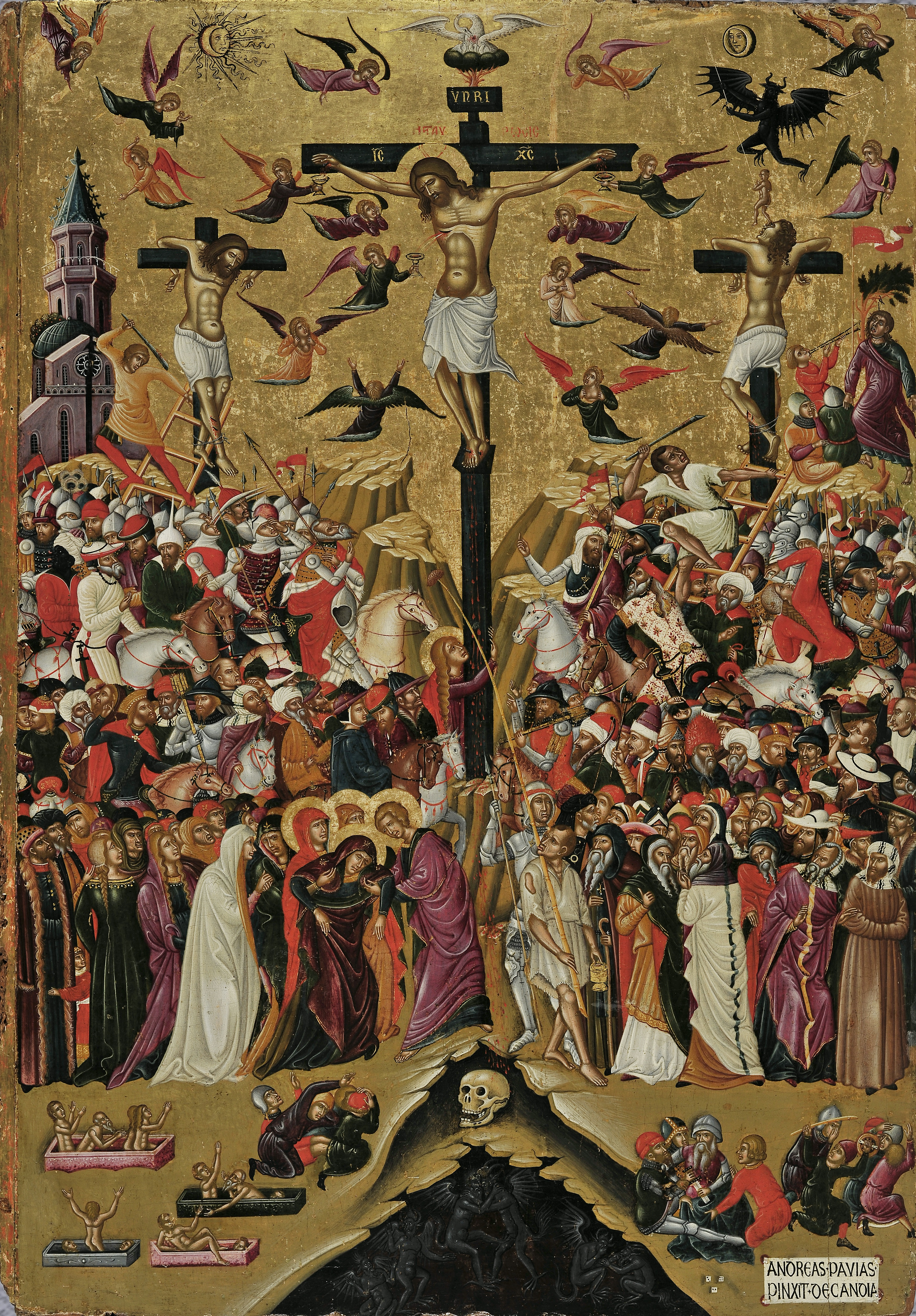
Crucifixion Pavias
