= The Crucifixion (Margkazinis) =

Painting by Georgios Markazinis

Crucifixion
- Σταύρωση του Ιησού Χριστού (Greek), Crocifissione di Gesù (Italian)
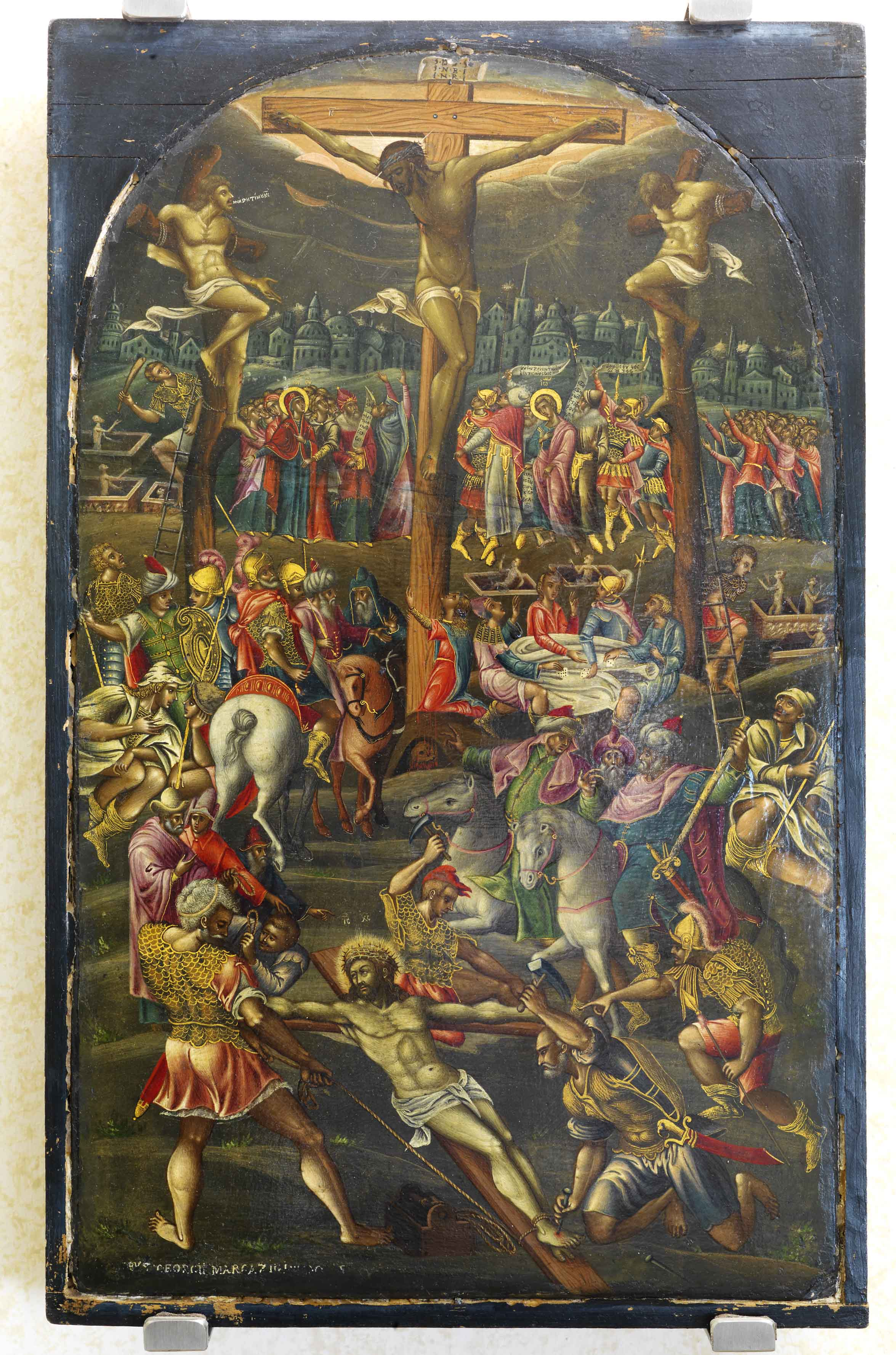
- Artist: Georgios Markazinis
- Year: c. 1647
- Medium: Oil Painting on Limestone
- Movement: Late Cretan School
- Subject: Crucifixion of Jesus
- Dimensions: 41 cm × 26 cm (16 in × 10.2 in)
- Location: Hellenic Institute; Venice, Italy
- Owner: Hellenic Institute

The Crucifixion is a painting created by Georgio Markazini. Markazini was a Greek painter from the island of Crete. He migrated to Venice. He was active during the middle part of the 17th century. Two of the painter's works survived. The crucifixion was a very popular subject among Cretan painters. Andreas Pavias, Emmanuel Lambardos, and Theophanes the Cretan created a similar style crucifixion. The Cretan painters frequently influenced each other.

Jan Sadeler I was a Renaissance Flemish engraver who migrated to Venice with his son and nephew. He was active during the second half of the 16th century. His engravings of the crucifixion series influenced Markazini's Work. Around this same period, the engravings were circulating through the Venetian Greek community. Theodore Poulakis and Konstantinos Tzanes both used the engravings as inspiration. They were Georgio Markazini's contemporaries active during the same period.

Greek and Italian Painters frequently added many figures to the Crucifixion scene. For instance, Andreas Pavias's Crucifixion features the dice player scene and the resurrection of the Christian saints. Both stories are part of Matthew's gospel. Other painters such as Ioannis Moskos featured the same pictorial representation of the gospel in his Crucifixion namely the dice players. The crucifixion paintings offer a rich array of symbols and meanings. The Crucifixion by Markazini is part of the collection of the Hellenic Institute in Venice, Italy.

== Description ==
The Crucifixion is an oil painting on limestone in a wood frame with gold trim. The height is 41 cm (16 in.) and the width is 26 cm (10.2 in.). The painter chose a different medium than wood. His contemporary Elias Moskos similarly broke the norm when he painted the Virgin and Child on bronze instead of gold. The Crucifixion was finished in 1647. The painting was first mentioned in an archive in 1683. In 1904, the icon was listed as an oil painting created on stone, and in 1949, the signature was authenticated. The painting was in San Giorgio dei Greci.

In the foreground of the painting on limestone, Margkazini used one of Sadeler's prints from 1582 as his inspiration for the passion of jesus. He painted the figures nailing Jesus to the cross in Venetian-influenced attire. The painting follows the Italian cangiante technique. Bright colors blend with the landscape. Gold is specifically implemented throughout the piece because the painter boldly removed the gold leaf prevalent in most of the paintings of this style. Gold boots and gold helmets detract attention from the golden halo's around the Virgin and John the Evangelist. Mary Magdalene is at the foot of the cross she does not have a gold halo. Instead of a golden halo, Margkazini paints a golden glow around the head of Jesus while he is nailed to the cross in the foreground.

In the background, Jerusalem and the clouds are gray similar to Ioannis Moskos's Crucifixion. Both feature variations of the grey color. Another common characteristic is the orientation of the cross. They are in triangular form but the Impenitent thief on our right is closer to Jesus's cross than the Penitent thief. The Penitent thief on our left is speaking. Greek letters close to his mouth say: remember me lord in your kingdom. There is similar text in the Moskos painting.

A crowd gathered behind the crosses, The Virgin Mary is present. Some of the people are followers of Jesus. They are looking up. Underneath the cross members of the Sanhedrin, and soldiers are gathered. Some of the soldiers are on horseback. Four individuals gamble for Jesus's clothing to the right of the middle cross. They are nobles and soldiers. The dead are also rising. Both scenes are pictorial representations of Matthew's Gospel 27:35–37 and 27:52–53.

== Gallery ==
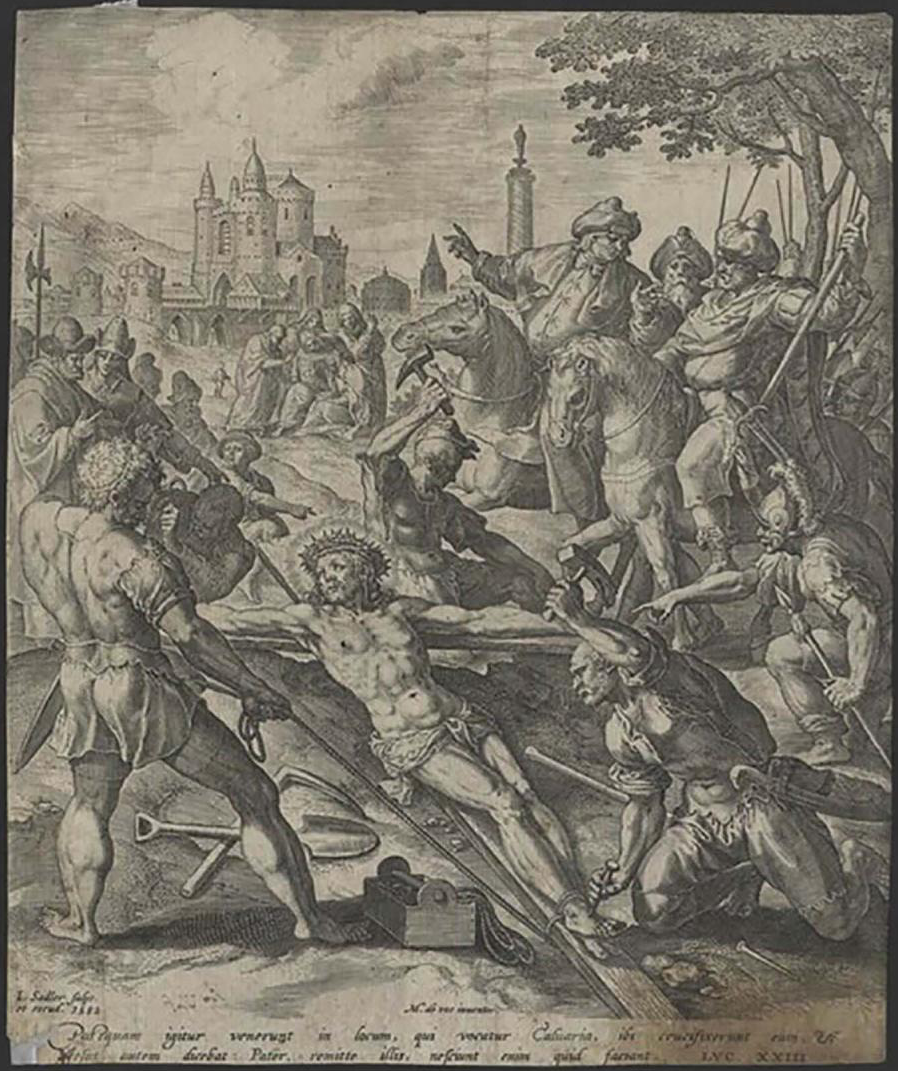
Passion of Jesus (Sadeler)

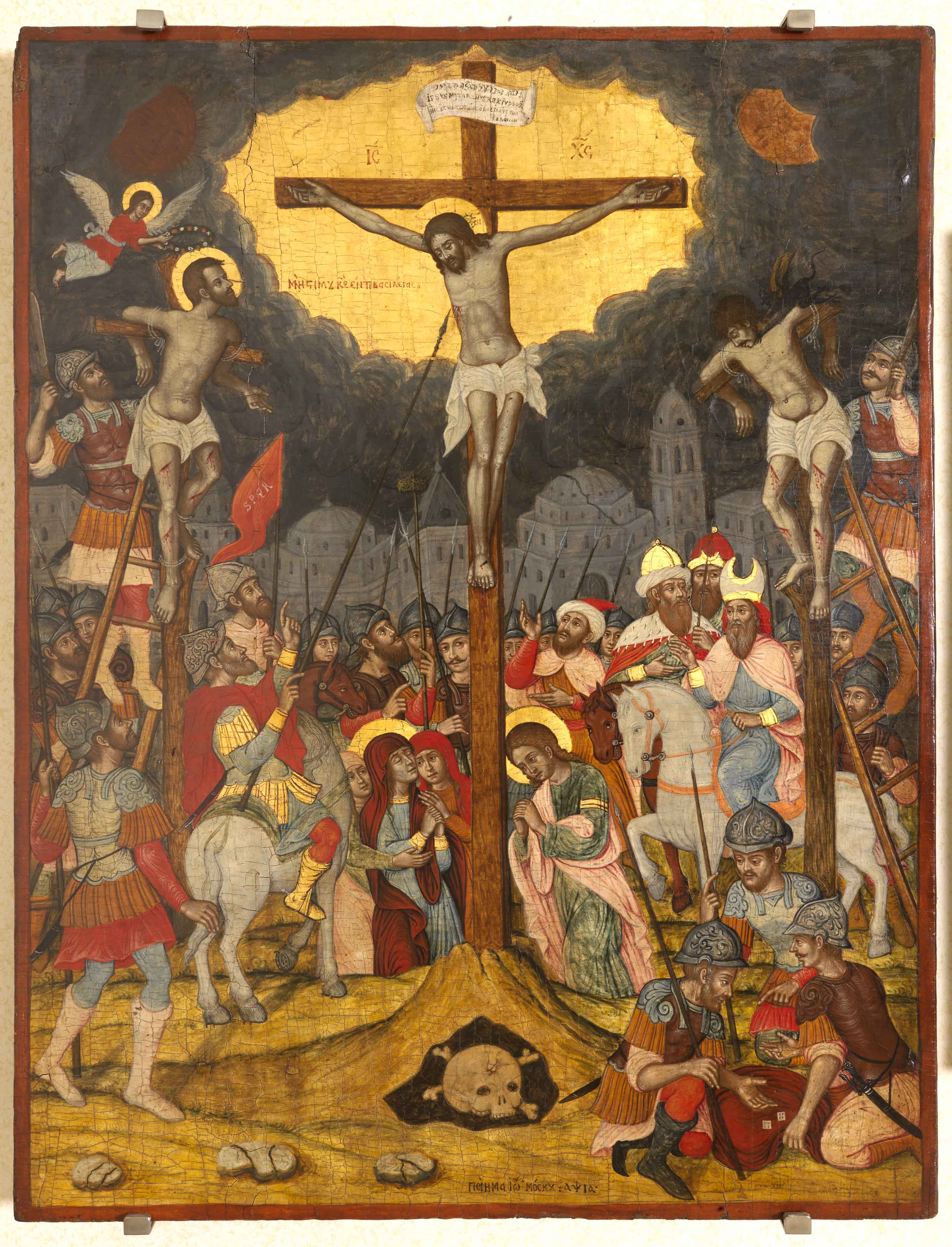
Crucifixion Moskos

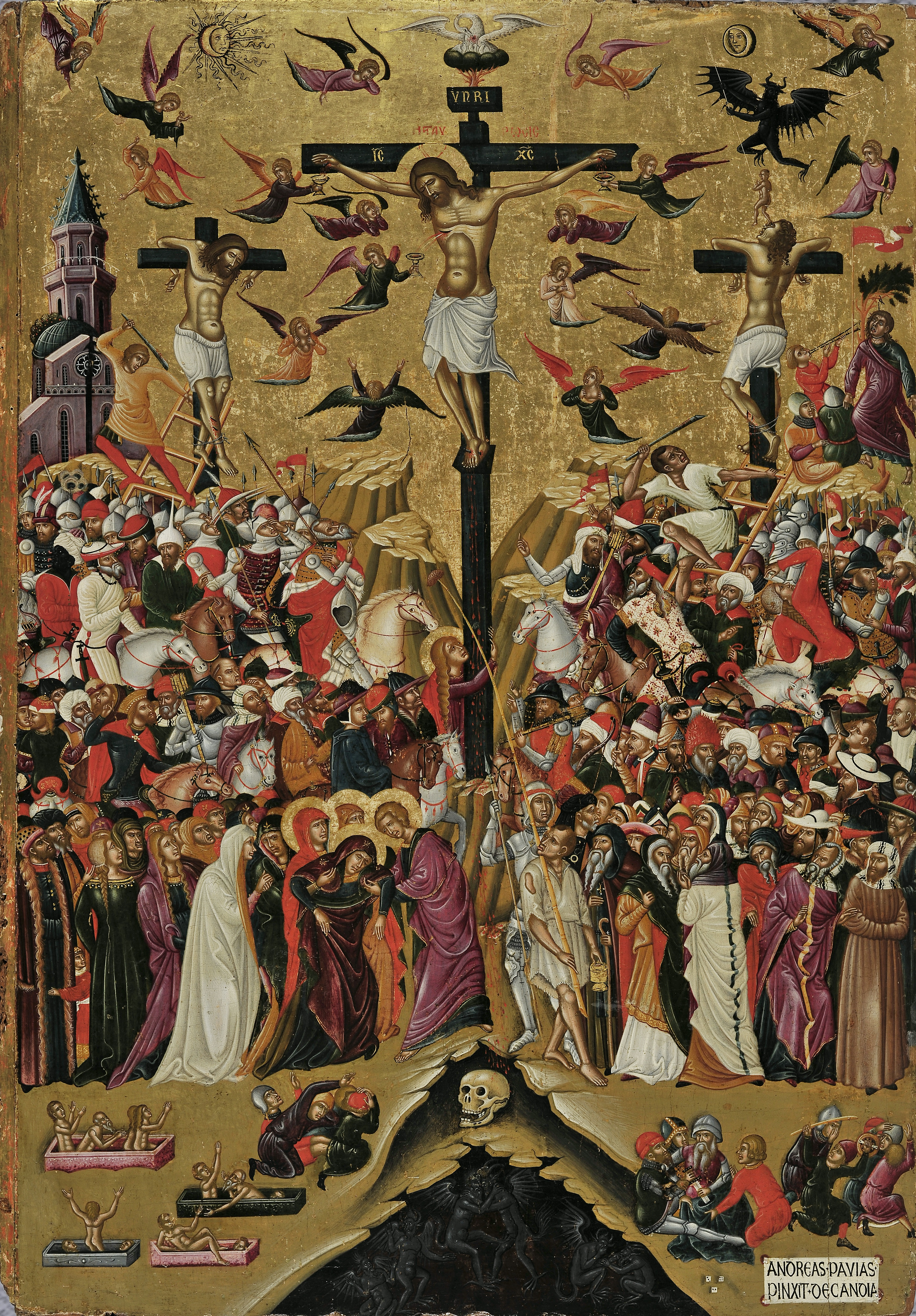
Crucifixion Pavias
