= Konstantinos Paleokapas =

Greek painter (1600 – after 1640)

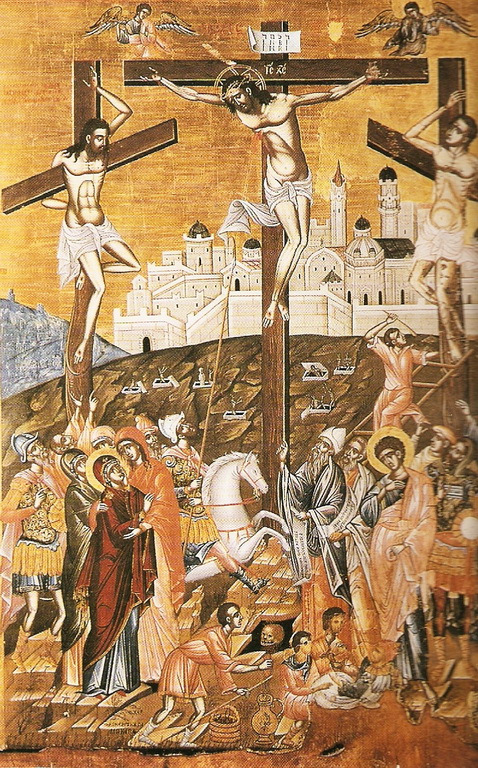
- Crucifixion
- Born: c. 1600; Chania, Greece
- Died: after 1640; Chania, Greece
- Known for: Iconography and hagiography
- Notable work: Crucifixion
- Movement: Cretan school

Konstantinos Paleokapas (Greek: Κωνσταντίνος Παλαιοκαπάς; 1600 – after 1640) was a Greek painter active in 17th-century Crete. He worked, albeit with distinctive qualities, in the style of the Cretan school, and his paintings are comparable to those of his contemporaries Elias Moskos, Leos Moskos, Franghias Kavertzas, Ieremias Palladas, and Victor. All these artists were heavily influenced by Venetian painting. Six of Paleokapas' works have survived, mostly held by the Gonia Monastery in Crete. The foremost piece is an icon of the Crucifixion of Christ; this is comparable to paintings of the same subject by Ioannis Moskos and by Andreas Pavias, although Paleokapas omitted the unique impenitent thief found in many works which follow Pavias' example.

== History ==
Paleokapas was born in Chania. Not much else is known about his life. Historians have dated his activity between 1620 and 1645, a period when Crete was an epicenter for painters. In 1635 he painted an icon of the Deesis, which is now in the church of Agios Georgios Afentis in Vroulidia, on the island of Sifnos. His paintings of the Crucifixion, Nicolaos Enthroned (1637), and Nilus of Sinai are at the Gonia Monastery. Four of Paleokapas' surviving works are signed, the most prevalent form of signature being χείρ Κωνσταντίνου Παλεοκάπα. His style influenced countless painters both Greek and Italian. Other artists who are also known to have painted the Crucifixion in a similar style are Theophanes the Cretan, Frangos Kontaris, Emmanuel Lambardos, and Georgios Margkazinis.

== Gallery ==
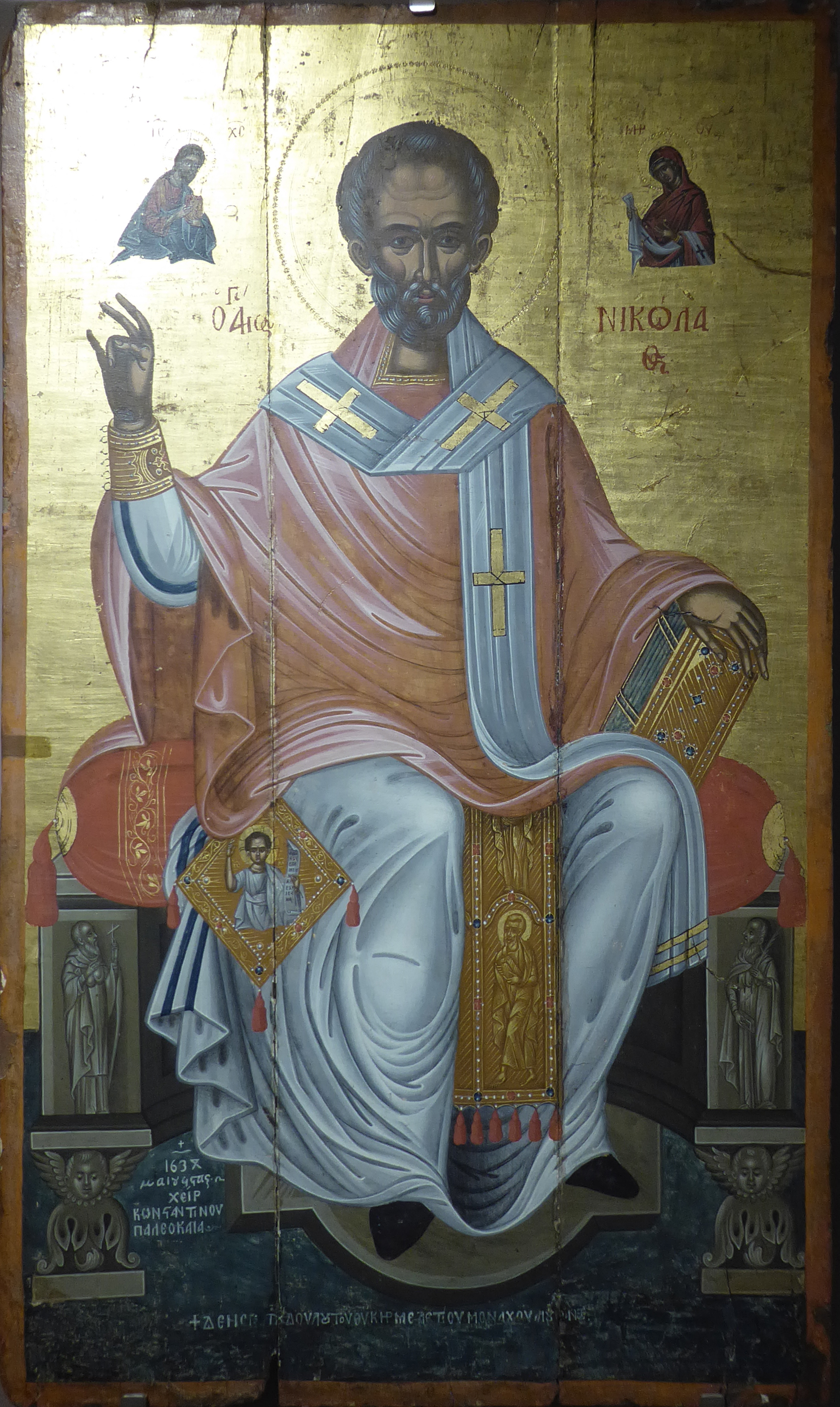
Nicholas Enthroned, Gonia Monastery

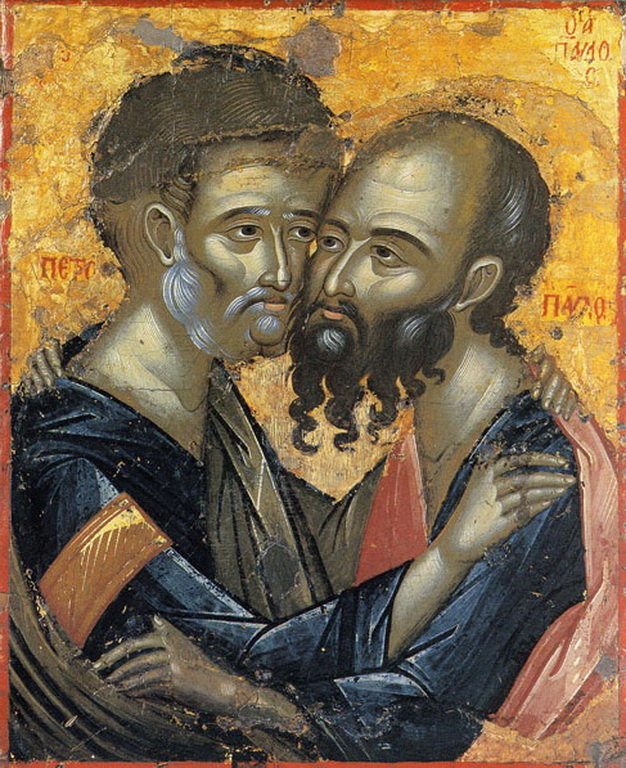
Saints Peter and Paul, Karakallou Monastery

== Bibliography ==
- Hatzidakis, Manolis; Drakopoulou, Evgenia (1997). Έλληνες Ζωγράφοι μετά την Άλωση (1450-1830). Τόμος 2: Καβαλλάρος - Ψαθόπουλος [Greek Painters after the Fall of Constantinople (1450-1830). Volume 2: Kavallaros - Psathopoulos]. Athens: Center for Modern Greek Studies, National Research Foundation. hdl:10442/14088. ISBN 960-7916-00-X.
