= The Crucifixion (Moskos) =

Painting by Ioannis Moskos

Crucifixion
- Σταύρωση (Greek), Crocifissione di Gesù (Italian)
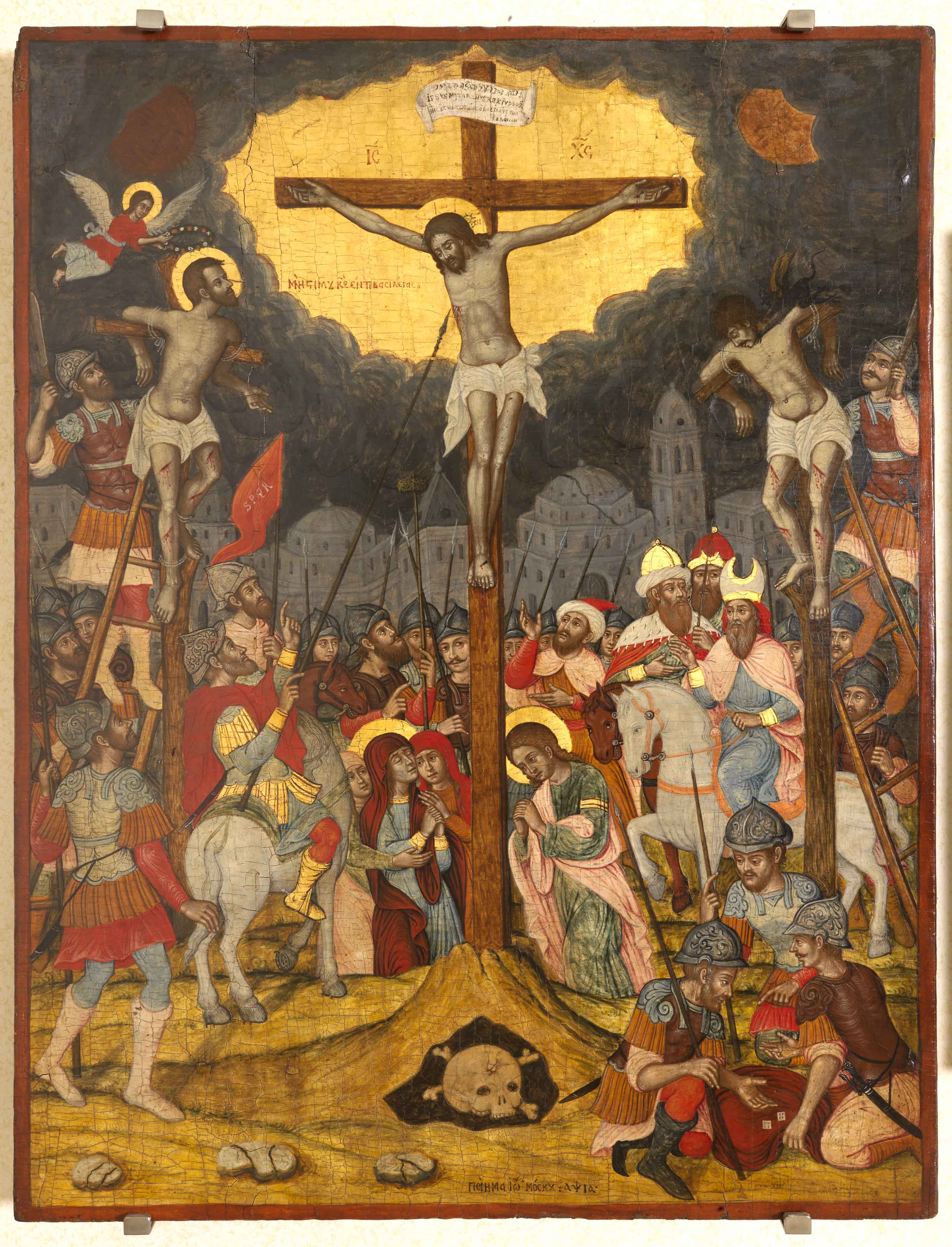
- Artist: Ioannis Moskos
- Year: c. 1711
- Medium: tempera on wood
- Movement: Late Cretan School
- Subject: Crucifixion of Jesus
- Dimensions: 91 cm × 70 cm (35.8 in × 27,6 in)
- Location: Hellenic Institute, Venice, Italy
- Owner: Hellenic Institute of Venice

The Crucifixion is an egg tempera painting created by Ioannis Moskos. Moskos was a Greek painter originally from Crete. He migrated to Venice. Two other painters named Moskos were active during the same period. Their names were Elias Moskos and Leos Moskos. Leos and Ioannis were both in Venice during the same period. Ioannis was a member of the Late Cretan School. He was active from 1650 to 1721. Forty-four of his paintings survived.

The crucifixion is one of the most popular subjects among painters. The most famous crucifixion painting of the Cretan School was completed by Andreas Pavias. Countless Greek and Italian painters were inspired by his work. Other notable crucifixions were completed by Konstantinos Paleokapas and Georgios Markazinis. The crucifixion paintings each offer a unique array of hidden symbols and meanings. The most common are the dice players and the resurrection of the Christian saints. In the dice player scene, soldiers gamble to see who wins the clothes of Jesus, the story is part of Matthew 27:35–37. The crucifixion by Moskos is part of the collection of the Hellenic Institute of Venice.

== Description ==
The painting is egg tempera and gold leaf on a wood panel. The height is 91 cm (35.8 in) and the width is 70 cm (27.5 in). The work was completed in 1711. The first record of the icon was in 1742. The painting was mentioned in later catalogs namely 1904 and 1949. It was characterized as the work of Ioannis Moskos, the 1949 catalog also authenticated his signature. The painting was associated with the Greek brotherhood of Venice and San Giorgio dei Greci.

Most of the gold background is painted with dark clouds. Jerusalem is in the background under the dark clouds. Both the sky and the city are painted with a grey variant. The painter masterfully blends the colors. The cross is painted in the foreground. Jesus, the Impenitent thief and the Penitent thief create a spatial relationship. The three figures form a geometric triangle. The Impenitent thief to our right is greeted by a demonic figure while the Penitent thief on the left is crowned by an angel. The Penitent thief also features a small inscription in Greek. The inscription says: Remember me in your kingdom. A similar inscription was present in Georgios Markazinis's Crucifixion.

A small crowd is gathered to witness the event. There is a huge crowd of soldiers and members of the Sanhedrin. The Virgin Mary, Mary Magdalene, and John the Evangelist are at the foot of the cross. Several other noble figures are also present. A soldier pierces the side of Jesus with the Spear of Destiny, as he hangs on the cross. Another important symbolic scene occurs to the right in the foreground. Three soldiers gamble over Jesus's robe. They are playing dice for the holy garment. The story follows Matthew 27:35–37.

== Gallery ==
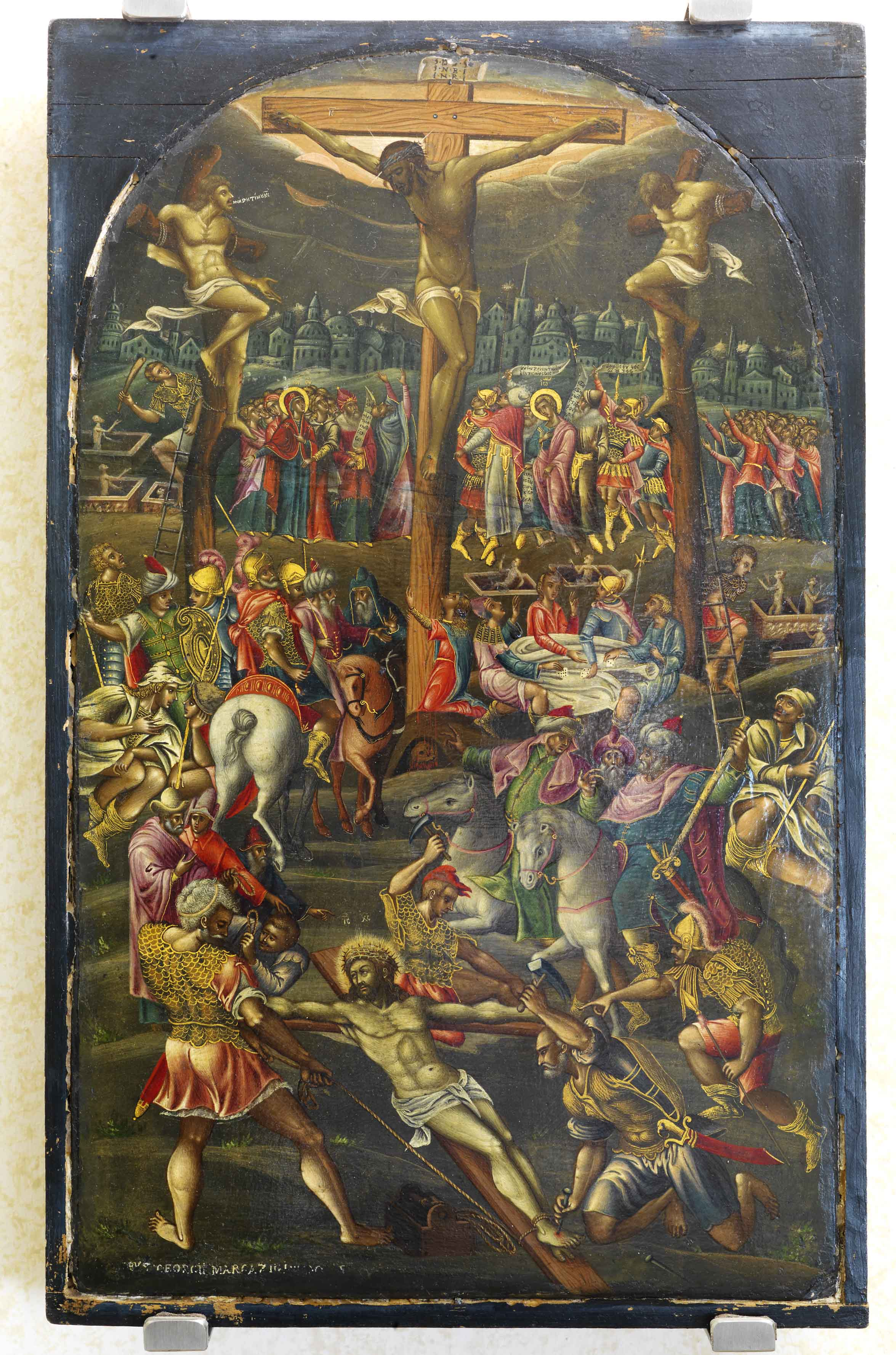
Crucifixion (Markazinis)

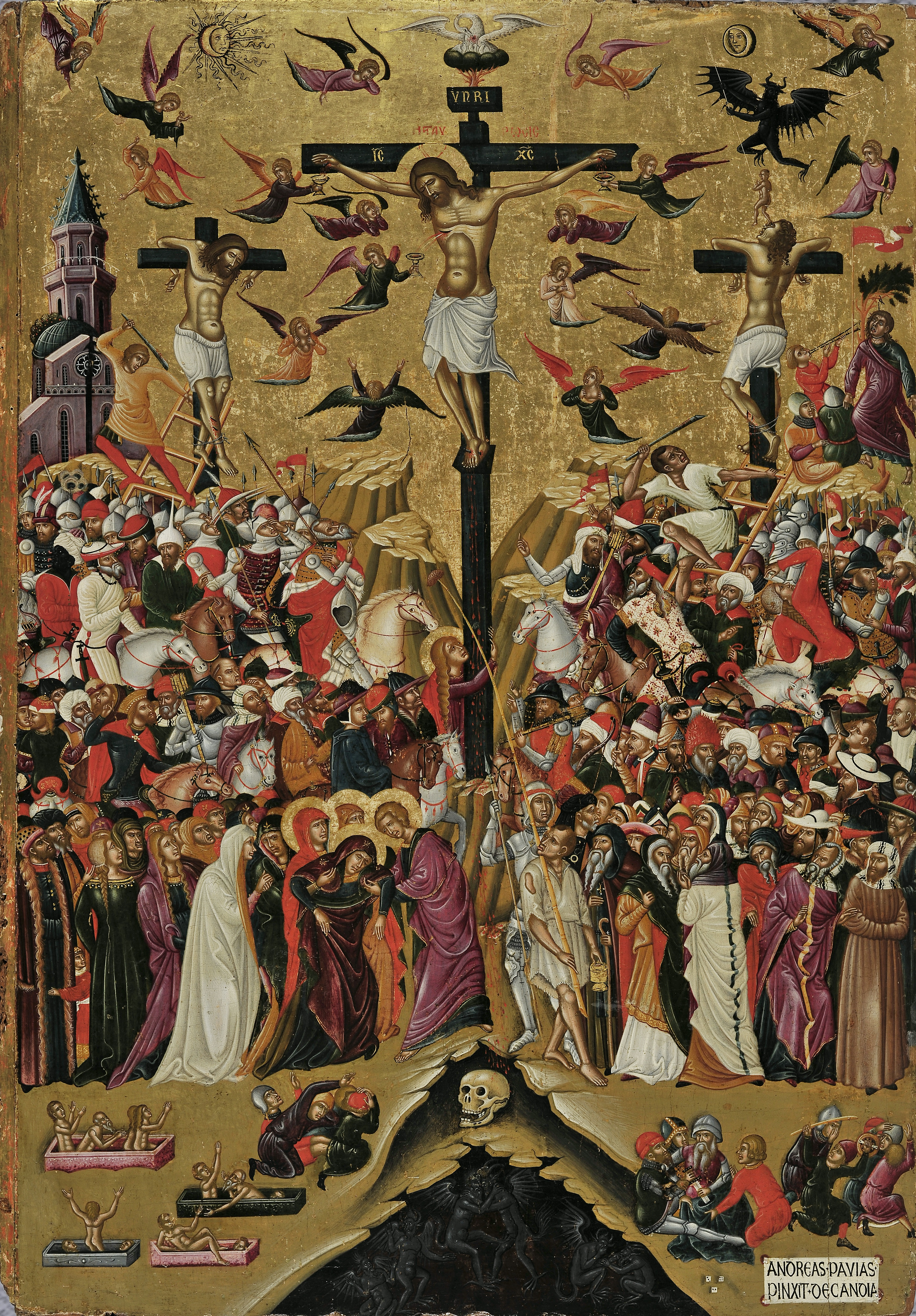
Crucifixion Pavias
