= Georgios Markazinis =

17th-century Greek painter

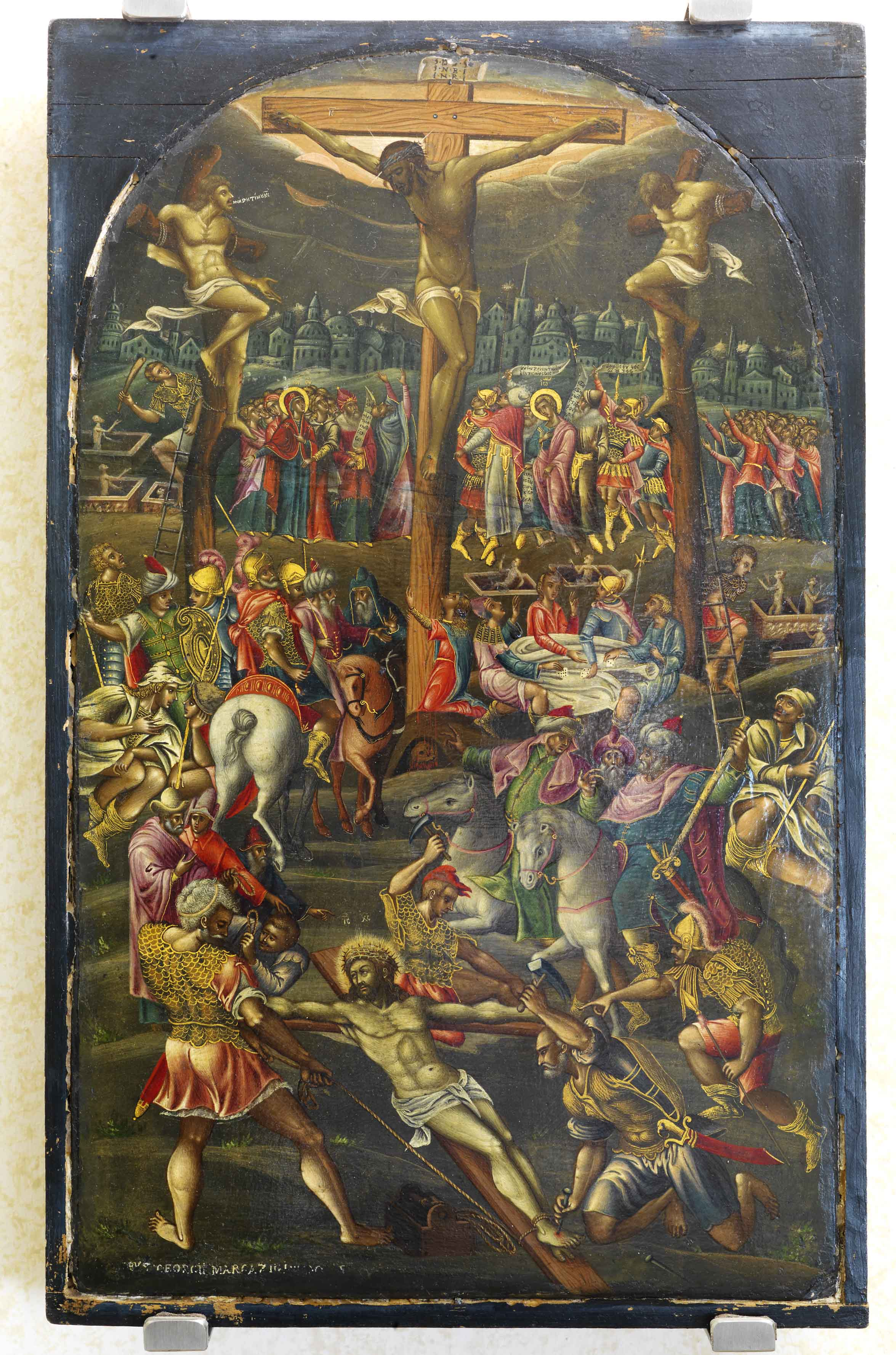
- Crucifixion
- Born: 17th Century; Chania, Greece
- Died: 17th Century; Venice or Crete
- Known for: Painting

Georgios Markazinis (Greek: Γεώργιος Μαρκαζίνης; fl. 17th century), also known as Georgius Margazinis or Margazinius, was a Greek painter from the island of Crete. His style is different from his contemporaries. He can be likened to Ioannis Permeniates, Theodore Poulakis, Elias Moskos and Konstantinos Tzanes. His work escapes the typical lines of the maniera greca and his art is heavily influenced by the Venetian style. Only two of his works have survived. His most notable work is The Crucifixion. The Crucifixion is held at the Hellenic Institute in Venice. His other work is of the Last Judgment which is located in a church at Skradin, Croatia.

== History ==
Markazinis was born in the ancient Cretan city of Cydonia, now modern-day Chania. Not much is known about his life. He signed his work in Latin. He alludes to his origin because he adds the city to his signature which was Cydonius. His surviving signatures were Opus Georgi Margazini and Georgius Margazinus Cydonius. He may have traveled to Venice where he worked and lived. His work is dated around 1647. He completely escapes the typical Greek mannerism prevalent at the time. He mostly resembles the transition from the maniera greca to the more refined style of Venetian painting. His Crucifixion is comparable to other Greek artists, namely: Andreas Pavias, Konstantinos Paleokapas, Ioannis Moskos, and Ioannis Permeniates.

In Markazinis's Crucifixion, the figure on our left is saying something to Jesus in the Greek language. It roughly translates to honor my memory. Jesus promised him forgiveness in the afterlife. This is one of the few circumstances where one of the figures is speaking to another in a painting of this style.

== See also ==
- Crucifixion (Tintoretto)

== Bibliography ==
- Hatzidakis, Manolis; Drakopoulou, Evgenia (1997). Έλληνες Ζωγράφοι μετά την Άλωση (1450-1830). Τόμος 2: Καβαλλάρος - Ψαθόπουλος [Greek Painters after the Fall of Constantinople (1450-1830). Volume 2: Kavallaros - Psathopoulos]. Athens: Center for Modern Greek Studies, National Research Foundation. hdl:10442/14088. ISBN 960-7916-00-X.
