= Constantine and Helen (Moskos) =

Painting by Ioannis Moskos

- Άγιοι Κωνσταντίνος και Ελένη (Greek), Costantino ed Elena (Italian)
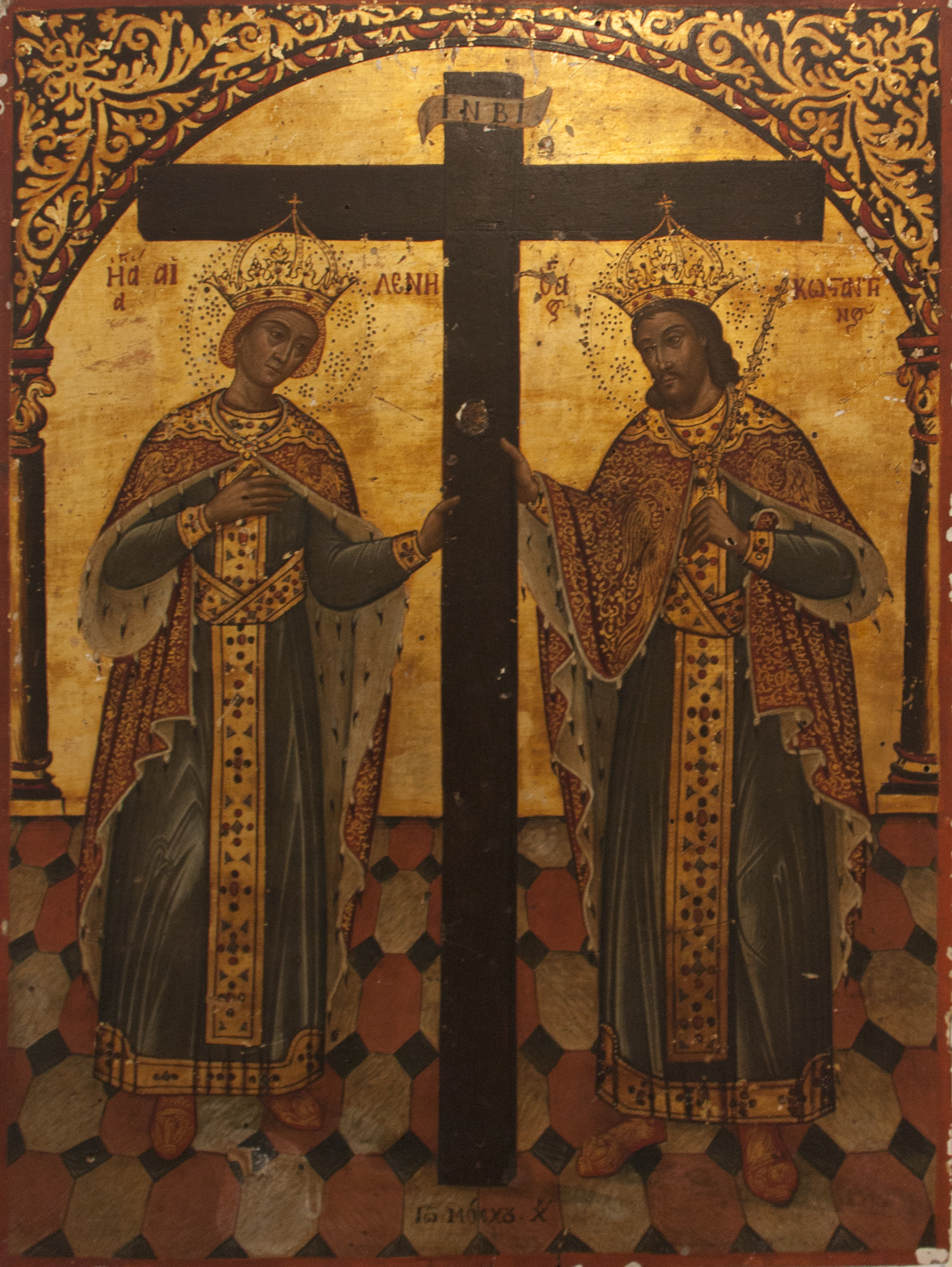
- Artist: Ioannis Moskos
- Year: c. 1665–1721
- Medium: tempera on wood
- Movement: Heptanese School
- Subject: Constantine and Helen with the True Cross
- Dimensions: 43 cm × 32.5 cm (16.9 in × 12.7 in)
- Location: Museo Mandralisca, Cefalù Sicily, Italy
- Owner: Museo Mandralisca

Constantine and Helen is a painting by Ioannis Moskos. He was a prolific Greek painter associated with Venice and the Ionian Islands. He flourished during the Late Cretan School and early Heptanese School. Three painters with the same last name were active during the same period, the other two were Leos Moskos and Elias Moskos. Ioanni's painting style demonstrates the transition from the Late Cretan School to the early Heptanese School. He began to integrate components prevalent in the Rococo. He was a Baroque artist. According to the Neo-Hellenic Institute, forty-four of his paintings survived.

Constantine was the first Roman Emperor to officially recognize the new Christian religion. Constantine and his mother Helen collected artifacts and written archives. During the time of their reign, the True Cross was discovered by Helen and brought to Constantinople. The True Cross is believed to be the cross that was used to crucify Jesus Christ. Several Greek, Italian, and Spanish painters adopted the theme in their art. Cima da Conegliano painted his own version of the two saints. Miguel Ximénez painted Helen with the true cross. The painting Constantine and Helen is located in Sicily, Italy at the Museo Mandralisca.

== Description ==
The icon was created using tempera paint, gold leaf, and wood panel. The painting's height is 43 cm (16.9 in) and the width is 32.5 cm (12.7 in). The artist implements the Rococo decorative motif found in Emmanuel Tzane's Saint Theodora. Moskos adds an elegantly tiled floor. The tiled floor was a characteristic uniquely prevalent in the works of Michael Damaskinos. Emmanuel Tzanes also implemented tiled floors in his painting of Saint Mark. The heavenly celestial angelic gold background complements the divine nature of the figures. The columns enclose the space. The figures are dressed in richly decorated imperial clothes. The folds of fabric indicate the painter developed an advanced technique of painting. He was a mature artist. The artist creates three-dimensional space in his painting. Both figures embrace the cross. Both have authoritative facial expressions. Their faces were painted in careful detail. Constantine holds a scepter in his right hand. The crowns and robes are covered with precious jewelry. The painter's signature is at the bottom portion of the work of art.

== Gallery ==
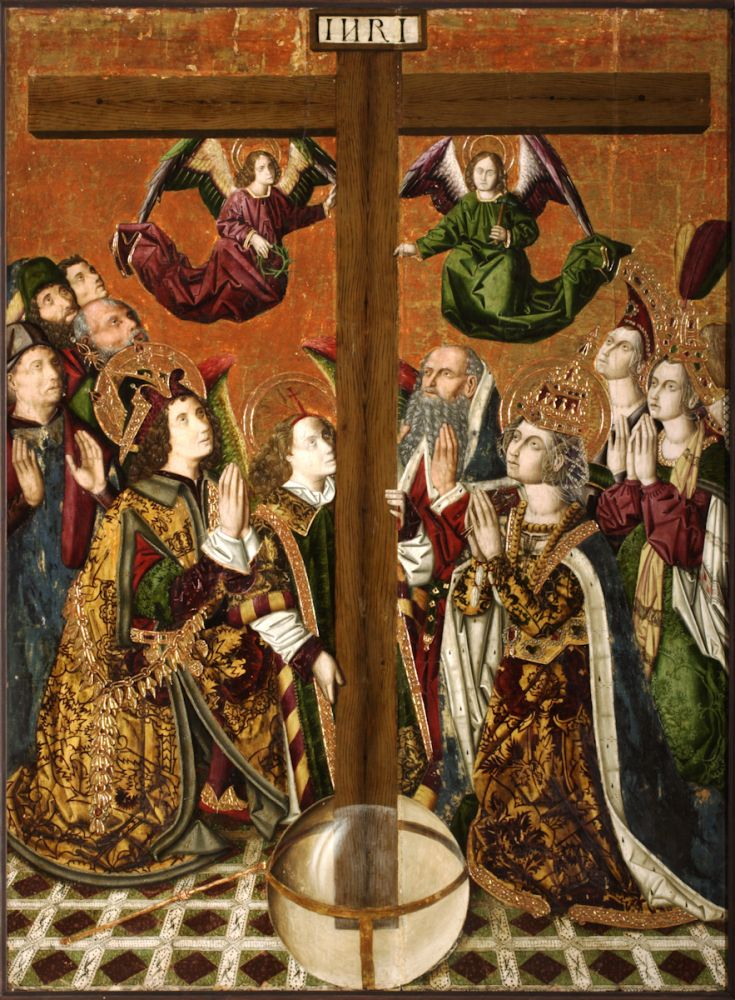
True Cross Ximénez

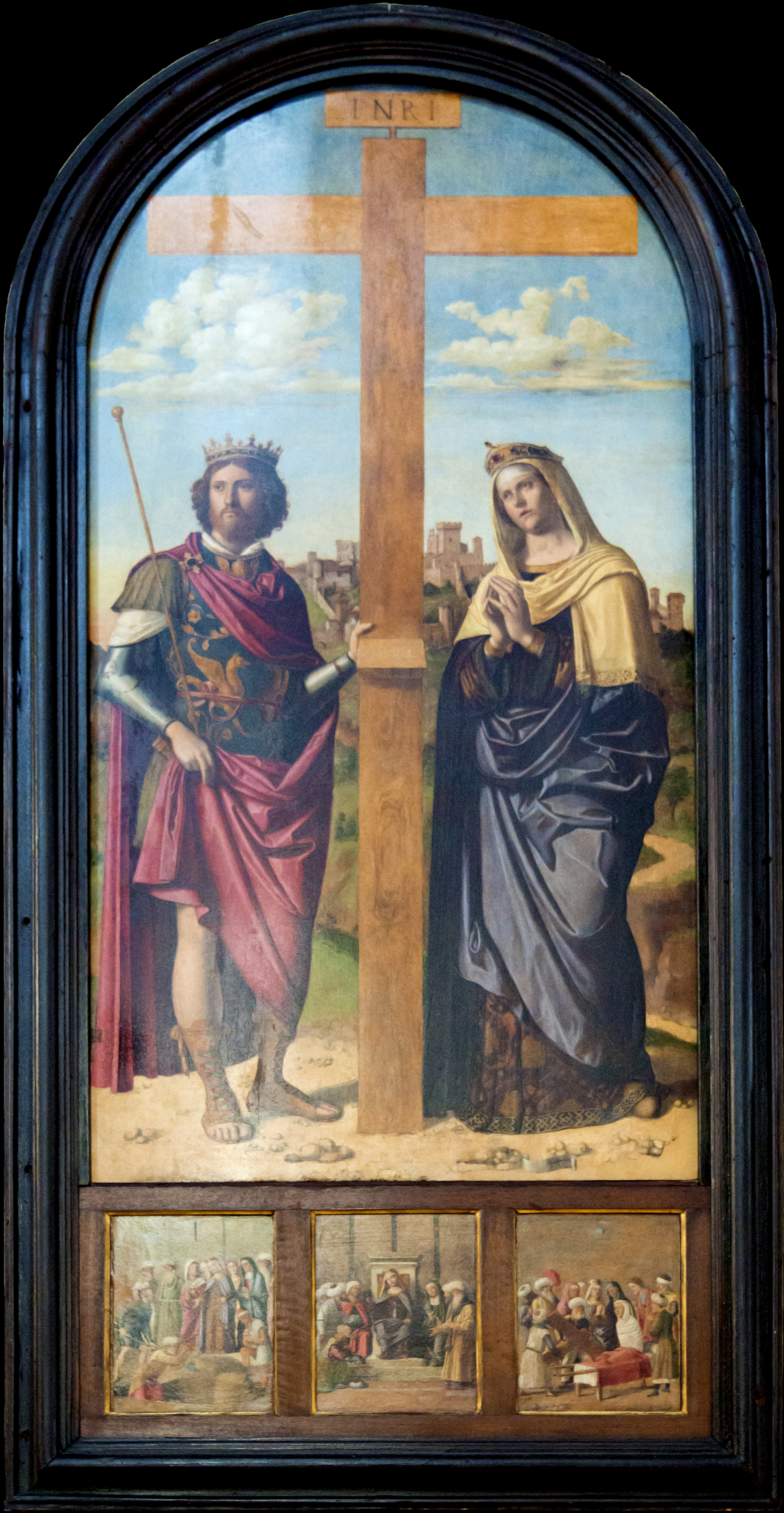
True Cross Cima da Conegliano

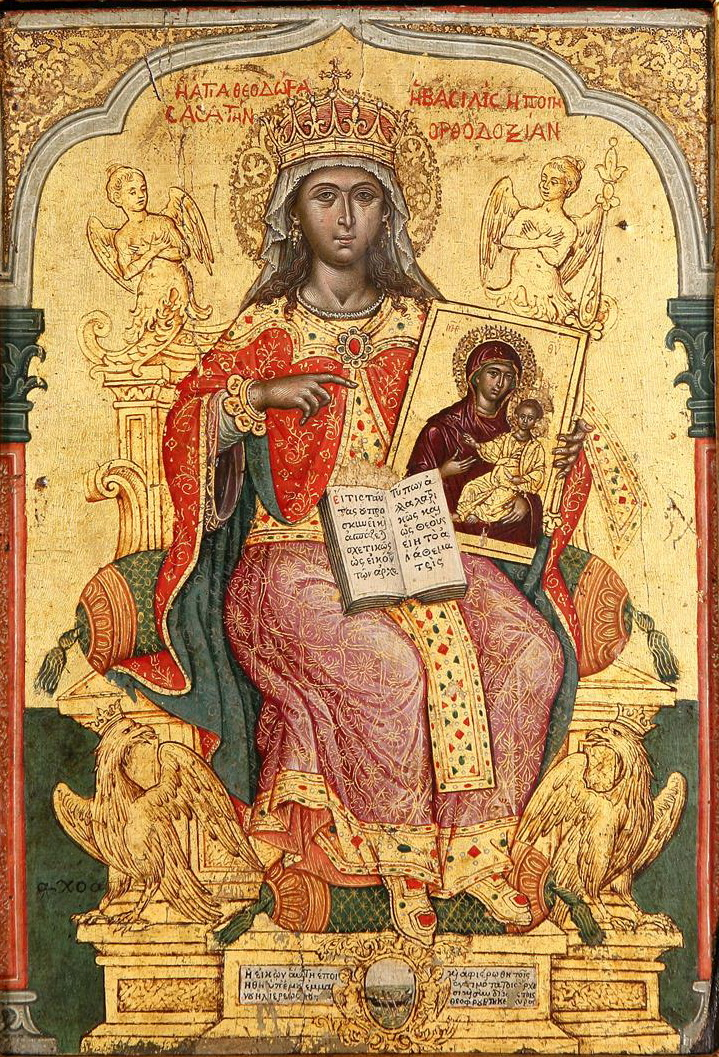
Rococo Decoratation Tzanes

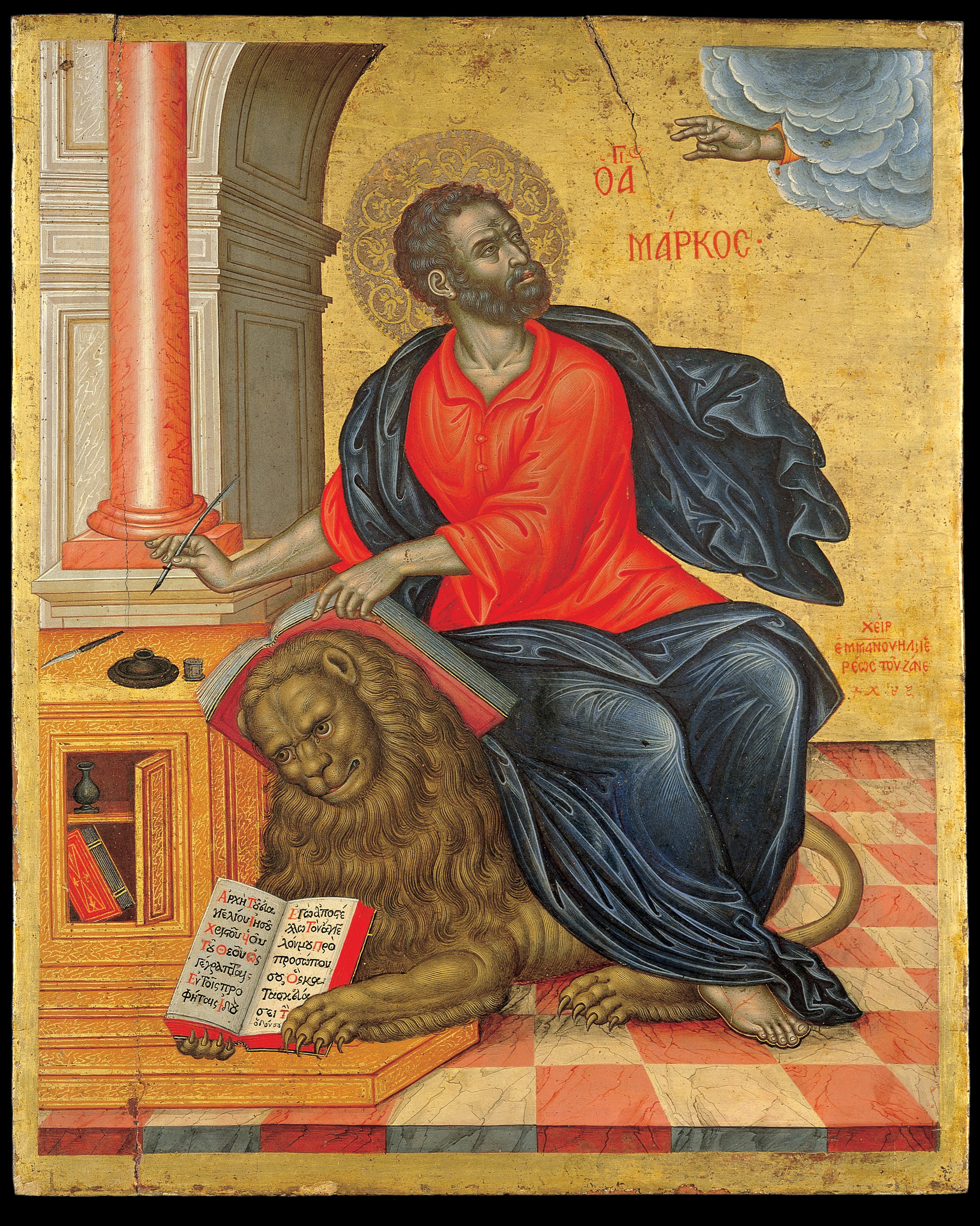
tiled floor example Tzanes

== Bibliography ==
- Drijvers, Jan Willem (1992), Helena Augusta, the Mother of Constantine the Great and the Legend of Her Finding of the True Cross, Leiden.
- Hatzidakis, Manolis; Drakopoulou, Evgenia (1997). Έλληνες Ζωγράφοι μετά την Άλωση (1450-1830). Τόμος 2: Καβαλλάρος - Ψαθόπουλος [Greek Painters after the Fall of Constantinople (1450-1830). Volume 2: Kavallaros - Psathopoulos]. Athens: Center for Modern Greek Studies, National Research Foundation. hdl:10442/14088. ISBN 960-7916-00-X.
