= The Crucifixion (Pavias) =

Painting by Andreas Pavias

- Η Σταύρωση (Greek)
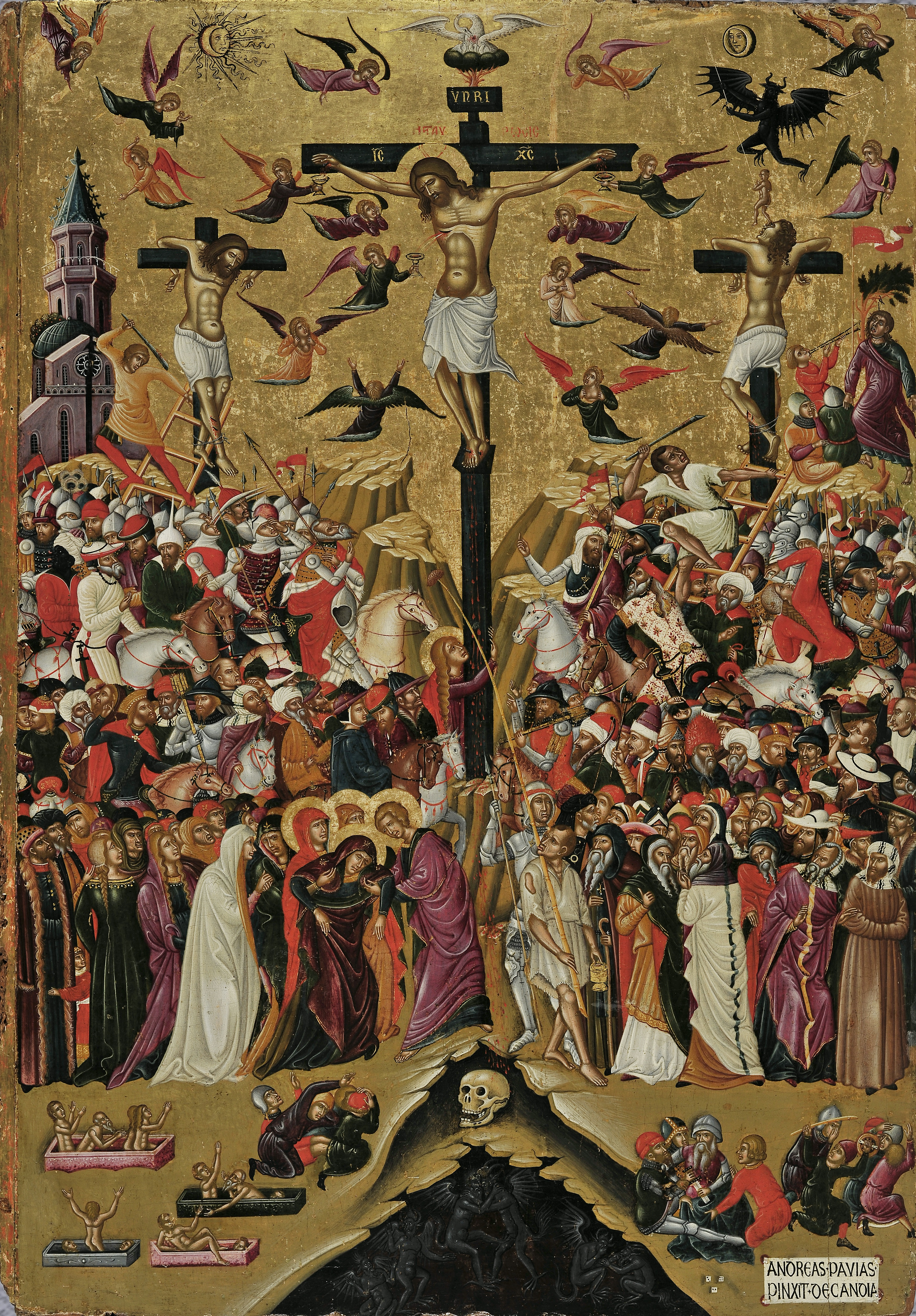
- Artist: Andreas Pavias
- Year: c. 1440-1512
- Medium: tempera on wood
- Movement: Cretan School
- Subject: The Crucifixion of Christ
- Dimensions: 83.5 cm × 59 cm (32.9 in × 23 in)
- Location: National Gallery (Athens)

The Crucifixion is a tempera painting by Andreas Pavias, who was active in Crete during the second half of the 15th century and is considered part of the Cretan School. It is now in the National Gallery of Greece. The painting influenced countless arts. Georgios Klontzas, Emmanuel Lambardos, Ioannis Moskos created similar works. Pavias introduced multiple figures to his Crucifixion. Georgios Klontzas began to employ a similar method in his famous work In Thee Rejoiceth. A work that was emulated by Theodore Poulakis and Franghias Kavertzas. The painting exhibited characteristics of the traditional maniera greca and the Venetian style.

== Description ==
The work is egg tempera on wood with dimensions of 83.5 cm x 59 cm. It was created in the late 15th century and depicts the Crucifixion of Jesus Christ. It shows influences of Late Gothic realism but follows the lines of the traditional maniera greca. Jesus is on the cross which has the classic Greek inscription IC and XC. Angels are collecting his blood into cups. Above the cross is a white bird with a long neck. At the bottom of the cross, a woman embraces the cross with a very sad face. The Virgin is the second most important figure in the painting. She is very upset. She is held up preventing her from falling. At the very bottom of the image are a skull and demons. A similar section exists in the Crucifixions of Ioannis Moskos and Theophanes the Cretan.

There are also angels behind the cross. The figure on our right or to the left of Jesus on the cross is the Impenitent thief and he is turned around. A similar figure is in Crucifixion paintings by Emmanuel Lambardos and Theophanes the Cretan. There is also a dark figure above the cross of the Impenitent thief in the Pavias. There is a huge group gathered for the historic event.

The scene is very complicated due to the number of figures. He is one of the first Greek-style painters to begin to employ countless figures. The technique was later duplicated by Georgios Klontzas in both The Last Judgment and In Thee Rejoiceth. More painters began to use the multi-figuring technique. Leos Moskos Franghias Kavertzas also painted many figures in their similar renditions of both Pavias and Georgios Klontzas work. Pavias like Angelos Akotantos was considered a Cretan Renaissance master. Many artists adopted the new style that the early masters developed into their own works. Pavias influenced both Greek and Italian painters and is considered one of the forefathers of the Cretan Renaissance.

== Gallery ==
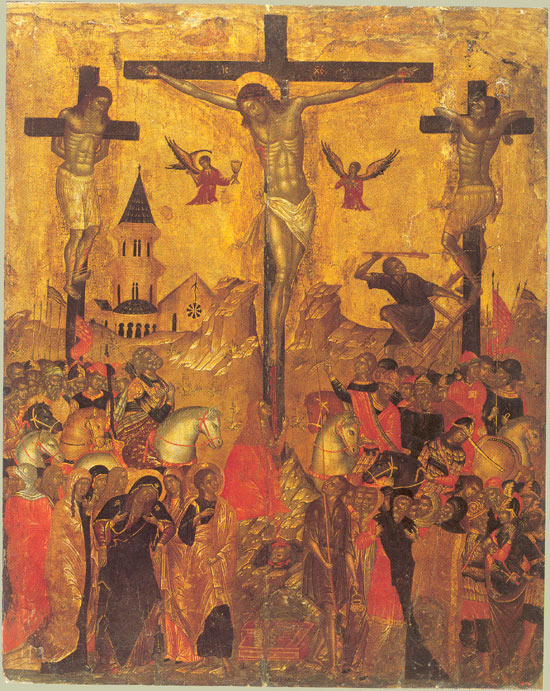
Crucifixion Emmanuel Lambardos

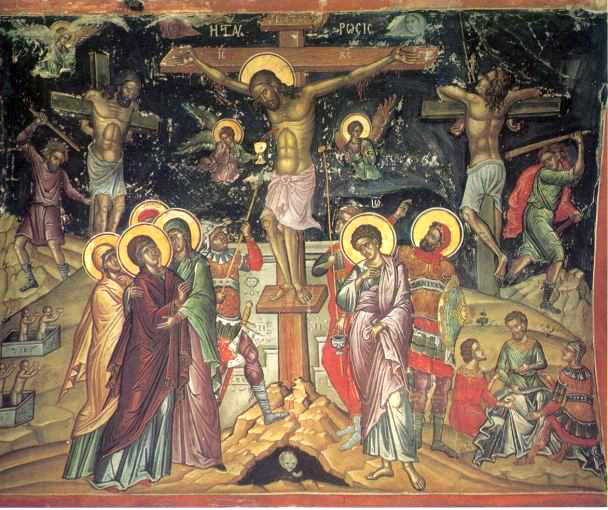
Crucifixion Theophanes the Cretan

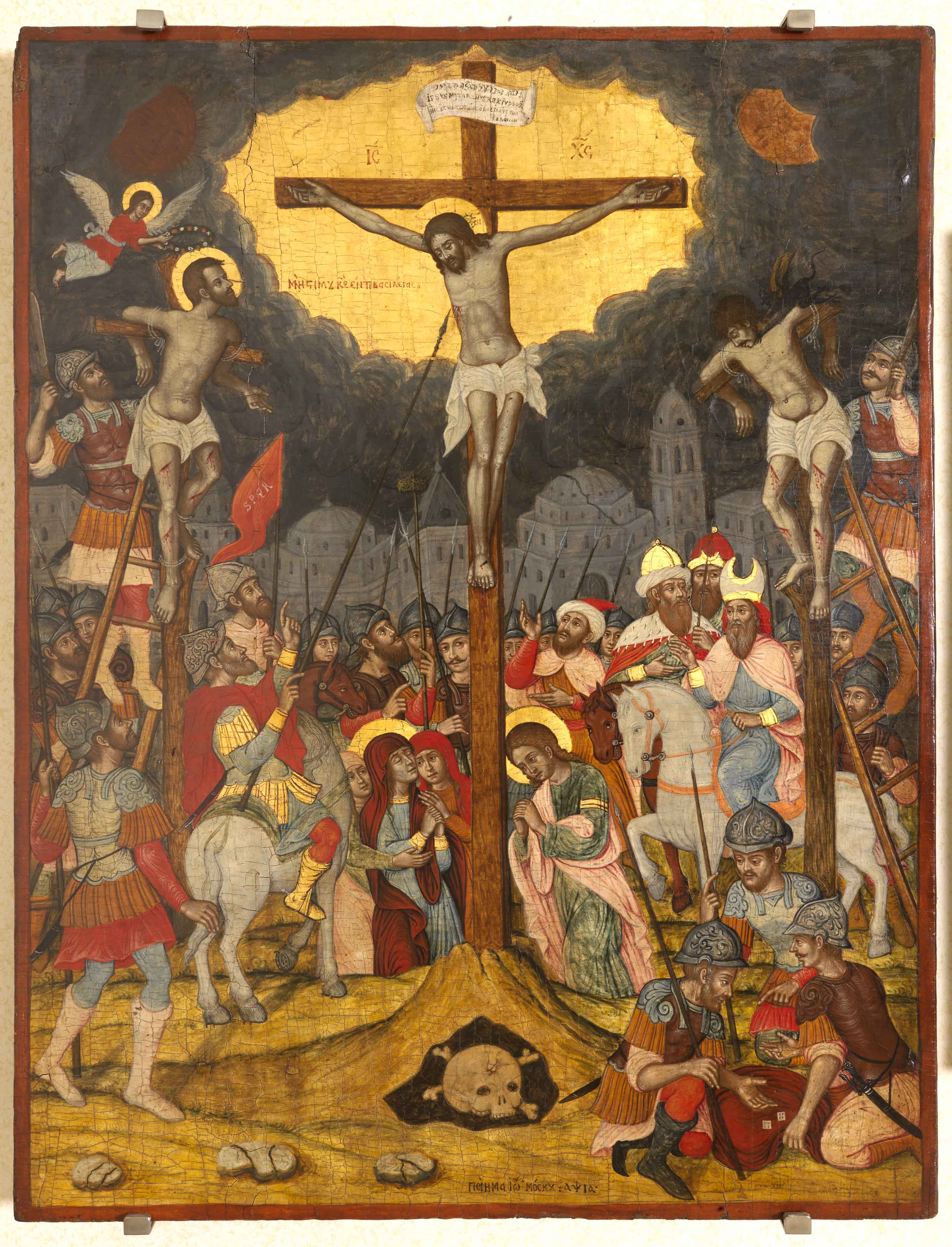
Crucifixion Ioannis Moskos
