= Gonia Monastery =

Greek Orthodox monastery in Crete

- Μονή Γωνιάς
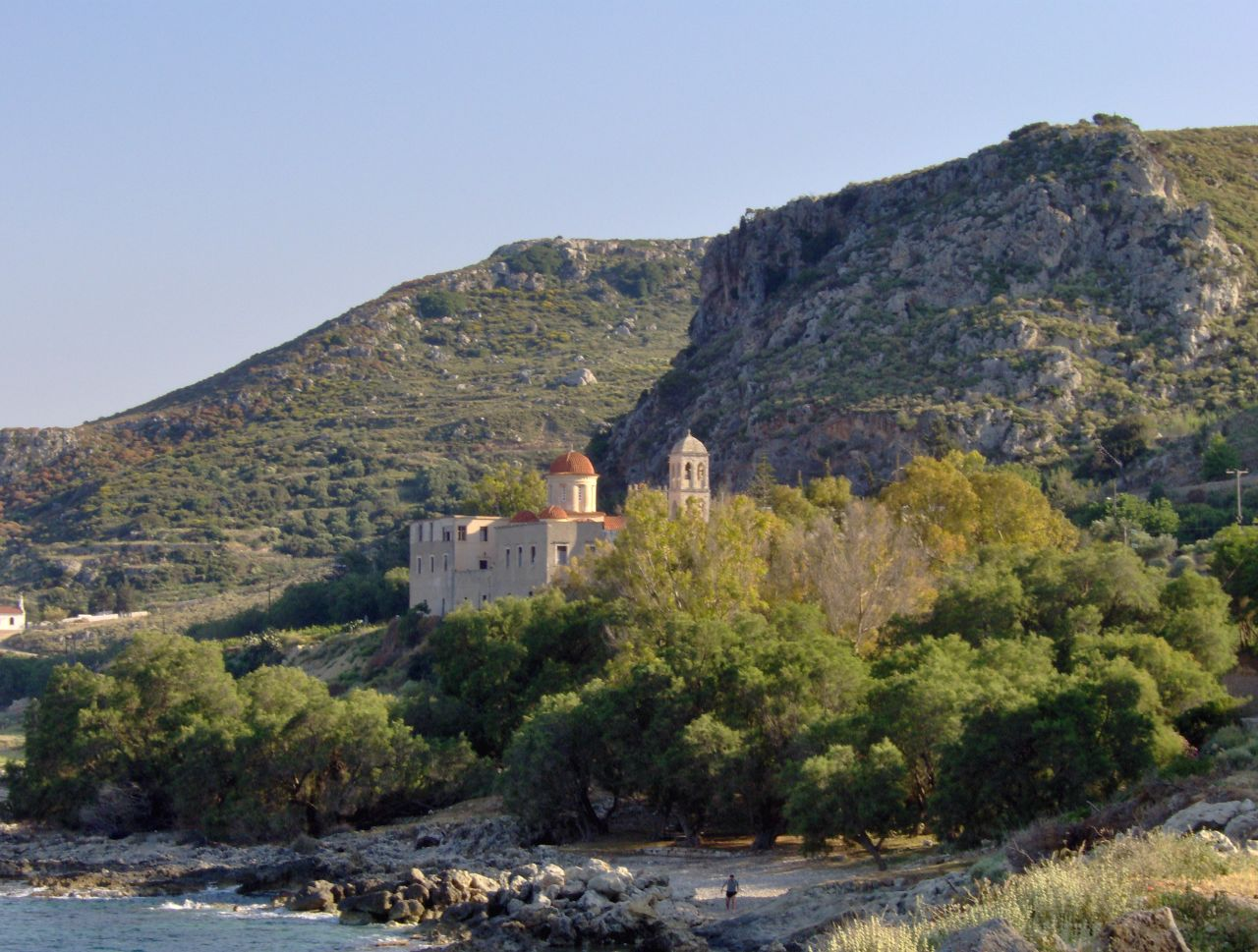

- Location of the monastery in Crete
- Interactive map of Gonia Monastery

Monastery information
- Order: Ecumenical Patriarchate of Constantinople
- Denomination: Greek Orthodox
- Dedication: Dormition of the Virgin Mary
- Celebration: August 15: Dormition
- Archdiocese: Church of Crete

Architecture
- Status: Monastery
- Functional status: Active
- Completion date: 9th century

Site
- Location: Kolymvari, near Chania, Crete
- Country: Greece
- Coordinates: 35°33′2″N 23°46′36″E

The Gonia Monastery (Greek: Μονή Γωνιάς), also known as the Monastery of Our Lady of Gonia or the Monastery of Panagia Hodegetria (Μονή της Οδηγήτριας), is a Greek Orthodox monastery located 1 kilometre (0.62 mi) north of Kolymvari and approximately 26 kilometres (16 mi) from Chania, on the southeast coast of the Rodopos peninsula in Crete, Greece, overlooking the Gulf of Chania.

The monastery was given the same name as Hodegon Monastery in Constantinople. Both were named in honor of the sacred icon painted by Luke the Evangelist. The icon featured the Virgin and Child and it is traditionally called Hodegetria ("She who shows the Way"). Some churches adopted the name Madonna of Constantinopli in honor of the Hodegetria icon.

== History ==
Dedicated to the Dormition of the Virgin Mary (feast day: August 15), the monastery was founded in the 9th century and was originally dedicated to St. George. It was formerly situated at Menies, on the ruins of the ancient temple of Artemis Britomartis (Diktynna). The monastery was built in the 13th century adjacent to a cemetery, but it was rebuilt between 1618 and 1634 in its present location, with Venetian influences in its architectural design and adornments. The distinctive fountain in front of the monastery's entrance was built in 1708, and the belfry in 1849.

According to monks the present location at Kolymvari was considered safer from attack. Despite this, the monastery was heavily damaged by Ottoman bombardment on many occasions throughout its history including in 1645, 1652, 1822, 1841, and finally in 1867, during the Cretan Revolt against the Ottoman Empire. Evidence of this last attack can be evidenced today by the remaining cannonball lodged in the seaside monastery wall. During World War II the monastery was partly destroyed by German bombing and it became one of the most important areas of Cretan resistance to Nazi Germany.

== Architecture and relics ==
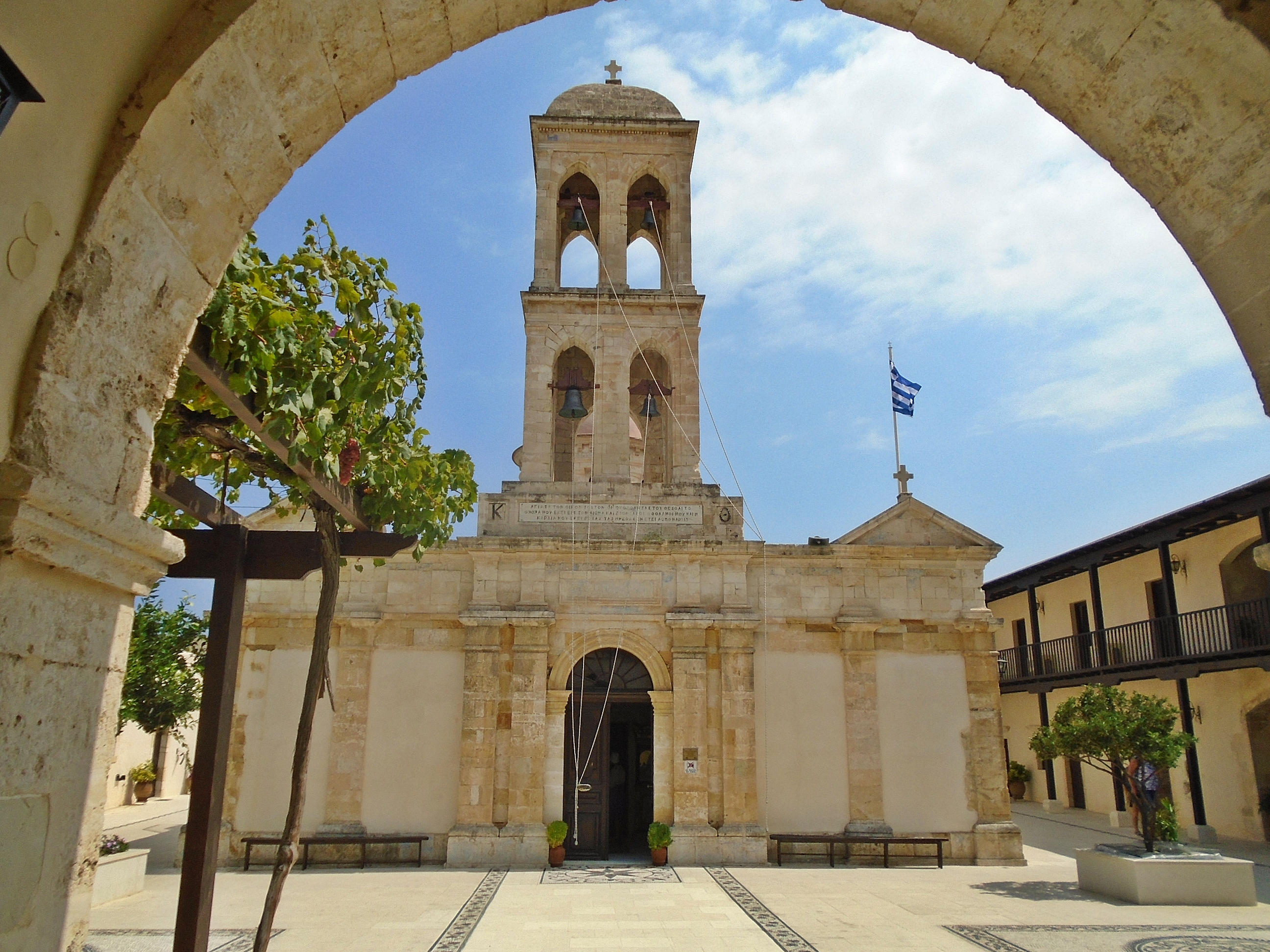
Gonia Monastery church and courtyard

The Gonia Monastery is a Venetian-style fortress monastery. Its main church has a narthex, a dome, and a number of chapels surrounded by a courtyard. The courtyard area also contains the quarters of the abbot and monks of the monastery, along with the refectory and storehouses.

Today, the monastery and its museum contain numerous Byzantine-era artifacts from the 15th to the 17th centuries, including Cretan icons by Parthenios, Andreas Ritzos, and Neilos. It also has numerous relics and other rare religious treasures from the Byzantine period, and ancient inscriptions on the walls.

== See also ==
- Church of Crete
- List of Greek Orthodox monasteries in Greece
- List of museums in Crete
