= Impenitent thief =

Thief crucified alongside Jesus

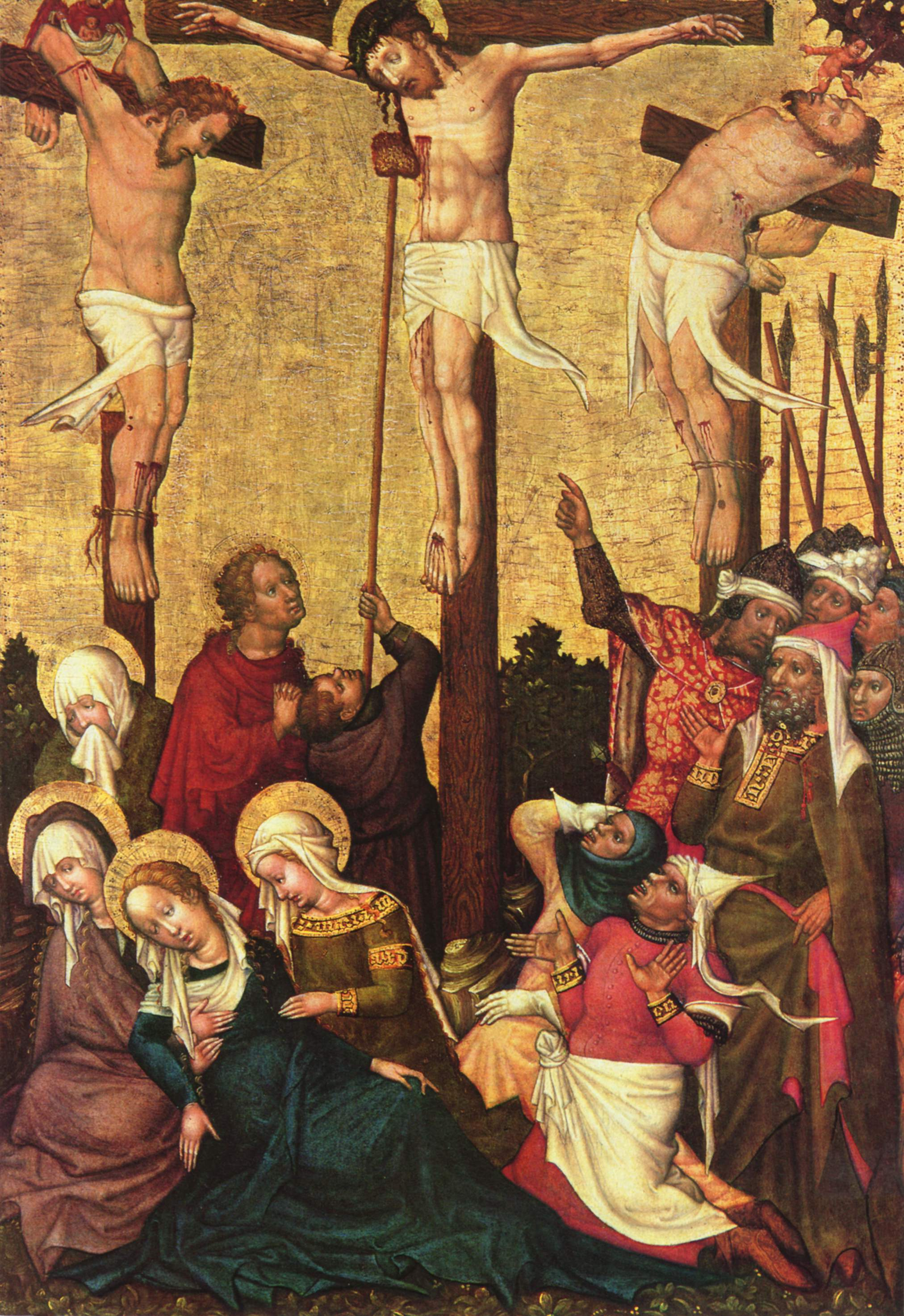
Crucifixion by Hans von Tübingen showing the penitent thief on Christ's right (the left of the picture), and Gestas, the impenitent thief, on Christ's left with a devil. Depictions of the crucifixion of Jesus often show Jesus's head inclined to his right, showing his acceptance of the penitent thief.

The impenitent thief is a man in the New Testament account of the crucifixion of Jesus. In the Gospel narrative, two bandits are crucified alongside Jesus. In the first two gospels (Matthew and Mark), they both join the crowd in mocking him. In the Gospel of Luke, however, one taunts Jesus about not saving himself and them, and the other (known as the penitent thief) asks for mercy.

In apocryphal writings, the impenitent thief is given the name Gestas, which first appears in the Gospel of Nicodemus, while his companion is called Dismas. Christian tradition holds that Gestas was on the cross to the left of Jesus and Dismas was on the cross to the right of Jesus. In Jacobus de Voragine's Golden Legend, the name of the impenitent thief is given as Gesmas. The impenitent thief is sometimes referred to as the "bad thief" in contrast to the "good thief".

The apocryphal Arabic Infancy Gospel refers to Gestas and Dismas as Dumachus and Titus, respectively. According to tradition – seen, for instance, in Henry Wadsworth Longfellow's The Golden Legend – Dumachus was one of a band of robbers who attacked Saint Joseph and the Holy Family on their flight into Egypt.

== New Testament narrative ==
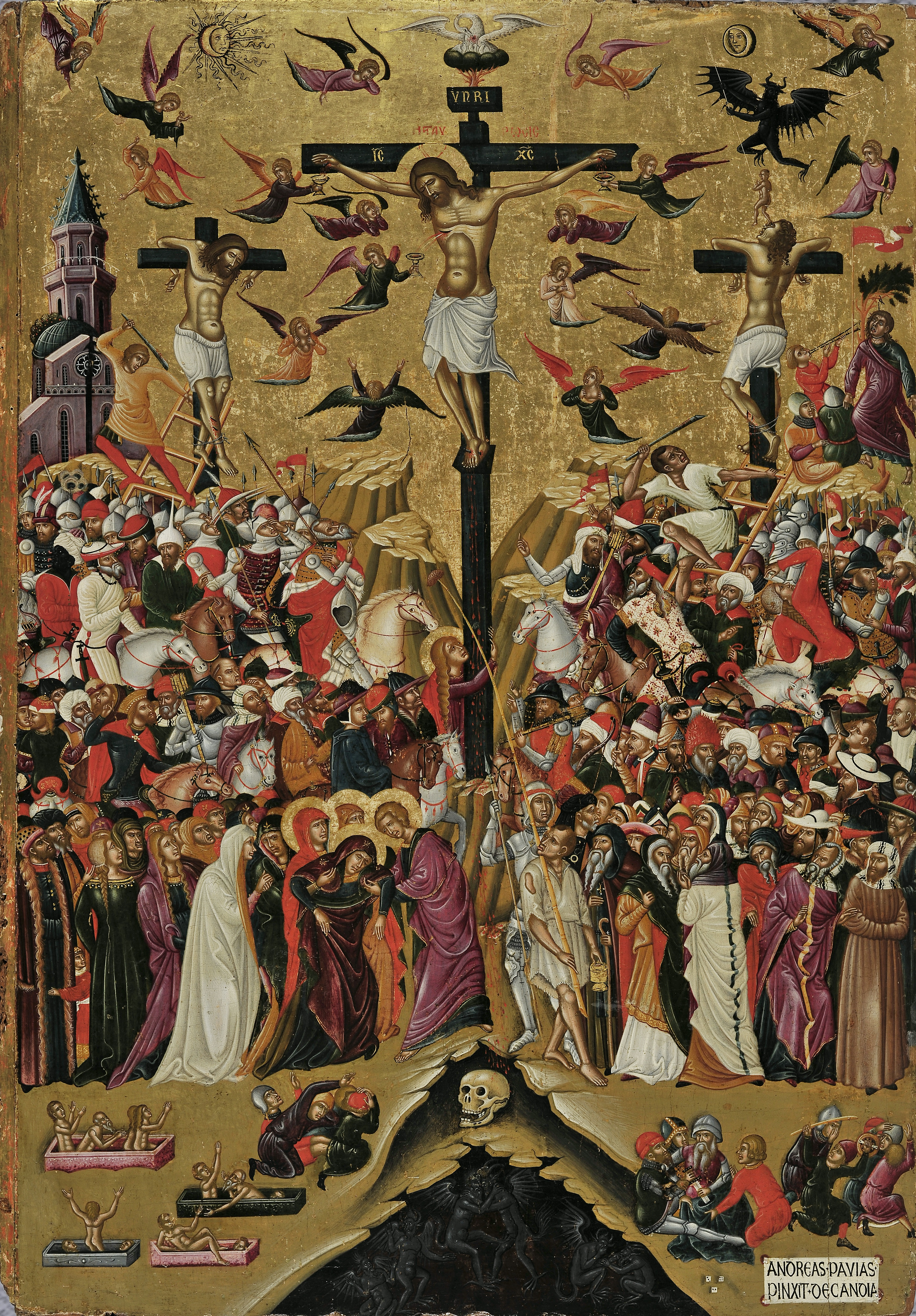
Late 15th-century Greek Orthodox icon by Andreas Pavias. The impenitent thief is shown to the viewer's right.

The earliest version of the story is considered to be that in the Gospel of Mark, usually dated to c. AD 70. The author says that two bandits were crucified with Jesus, one on each side of him. The passersby and chief priests mock Jesus for claiming to be the Messiah and yet being unable to save himself, and the two crucified with him join in. Some texts include a reference to the Book of Isaiah, citing this as a fulfilment of prophecy (Isaiah 53:12: "And he... was numbered with the transgressors"). The Gospel of Matthew, written c. 85, repeats the same details.

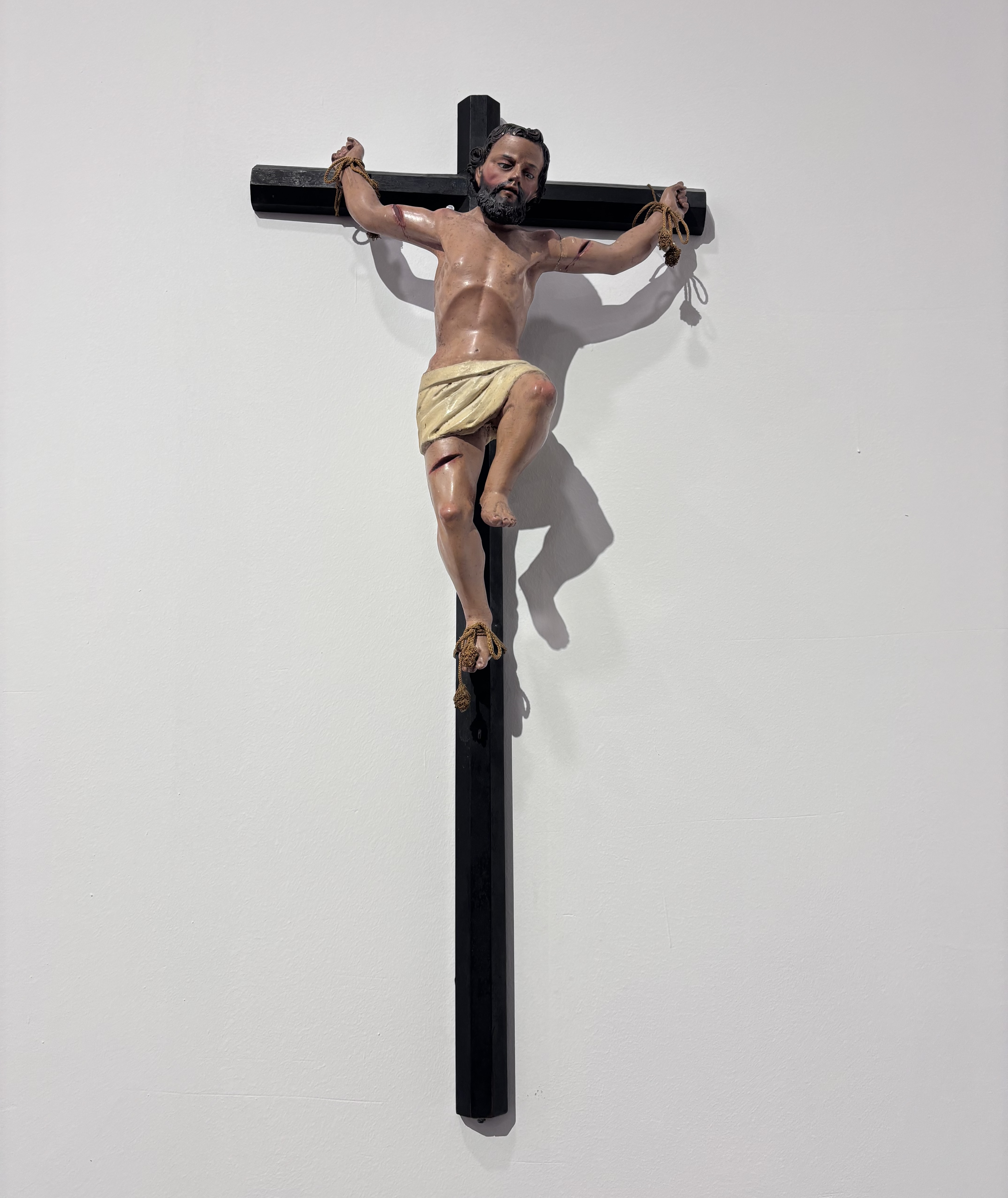
Gestas (anonymous, 18th century). Santo Domingo Convent, Quito

In the Gospel of Luke from c. 80 – c. 90, the details are varied: one of the thieves rebukes the other for mocking Jesus, and asks Jesus to remember him "when You come into Your kingdom". Jesus replies by promising him that he will be with him that same day in Paradise. Holy tradition has given this bandit the epithet of the penitent thief and the other the impenitent thief.

The Gospel of John, thought to be written c. 90 – c. 95, also says that Jesus was crucified with two others, but in this account they are not described in more detail and their words are not recorded.

== See also ==
- List of names for the Biblical nameless
