= Ioannis Moskos =

Greek painter

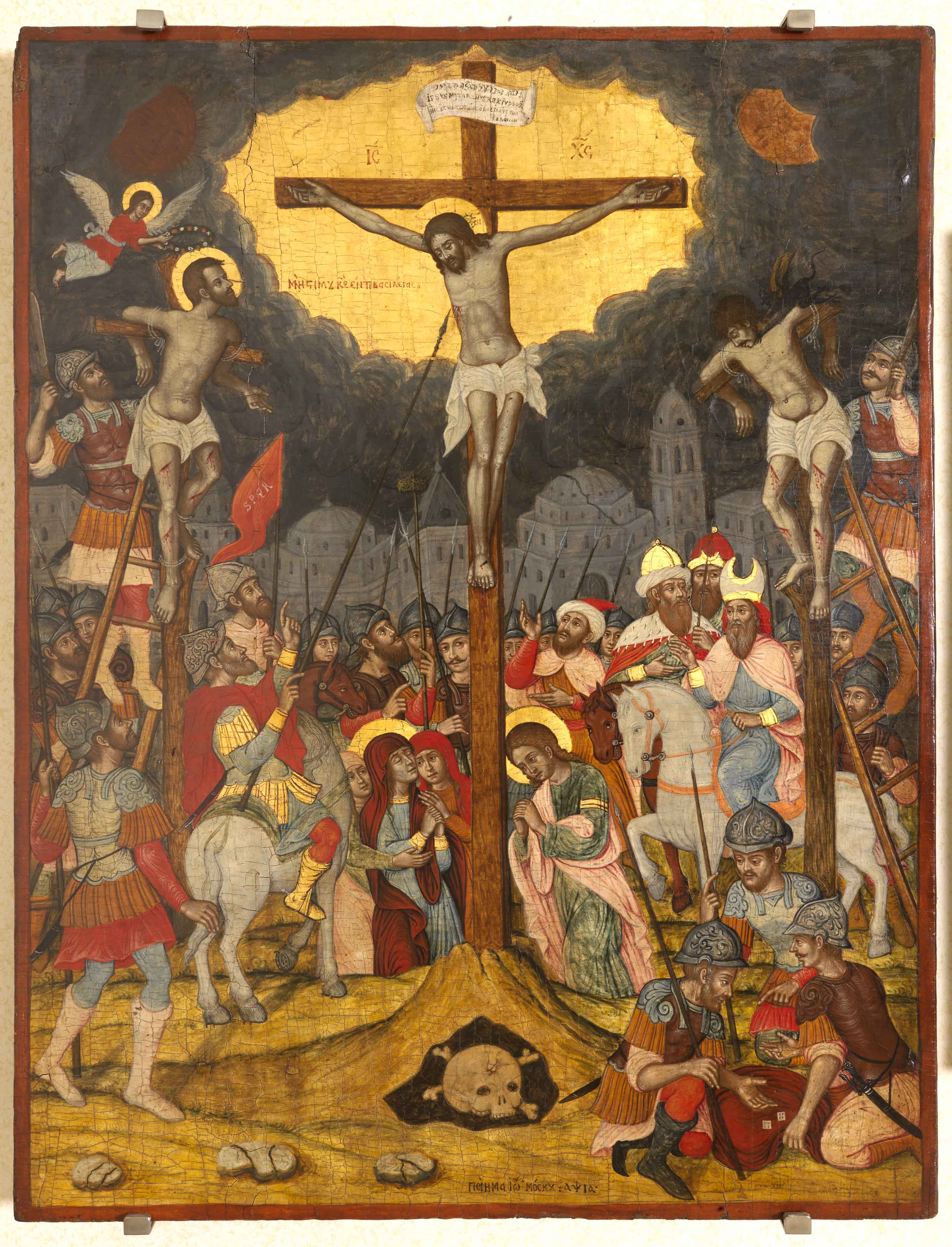
- Crucifixion of Jesus
- Born: between 1635 and 1644; Rethymno
- Died: 1721; Venice
- Movement: Cretan School
- Spouse: Ergina Klarotzanopoula

Ioannis Moskos (Greek: Ιωάννης Μόσκος; born between 1635 and 1644; died 1721) was a Greek painter that migrated to Venice. Two other very famous painters with the name Moskos were active around the same period: Elias Moskos and Leos Moskos. Leos Moskos frequently traveled all over the Venitian Empire and was in Venice around the same period as Ioannis. He is not Elias Moskos's son. The Moskos painters may have had some relationship but documentation is unavailable. Ioannis painted in the traditional maniera greca and the Venetian style. His art resembles Michael Damaskinos and Andreas Pavias. He was affiliated with the church of San Giorgio dei Greci. He left a huge assortment of paintings that can be found all over the world. His most popular work is The Crucifixion.

== History ==
Ioannis Moskos was born in Rethymno sometime between 1635 and 1644. He migrated to Venice during the 1650s. The only record that exists of Ioannis is a marriage in Venice. He was married at San Giorgio dei Greci by famous painter Philotheos Skoufos. He was married to a woman from Rethymno named Ergina Klarotzanopoula. Famous painter Emmanuel Tzanes was also affiliated with the church. His brother famous painter Konstantinos Tzanes was with him. Leos Moskos was in Venice around the same period he is documented participating in three baptisms. No other records exist except for Ioannis's signed works. Some were located in San Giorgio dei Greci. Historians have used his signed works to establish an artistic style and background for the painter. His The Crucifixion for instance can be likened to the famous work of Andreas Pavias. His style began to resemble Michael Damaskinos.

Drakopoulou and Hatzidakis established that Ioannis is not Elias Moskos son because of two documented wills for the painter. The popular media and textbooks have often confused Ioannis as the son of Elias Moskos with no such evidence. In the first will Elias Moskos left his fortune to his brother George during the 1660s. In his final will he mentions his two children George and Maria. According to the Neo-Hellenic Institute forty-four of his paintings survived.

== Gallery ==
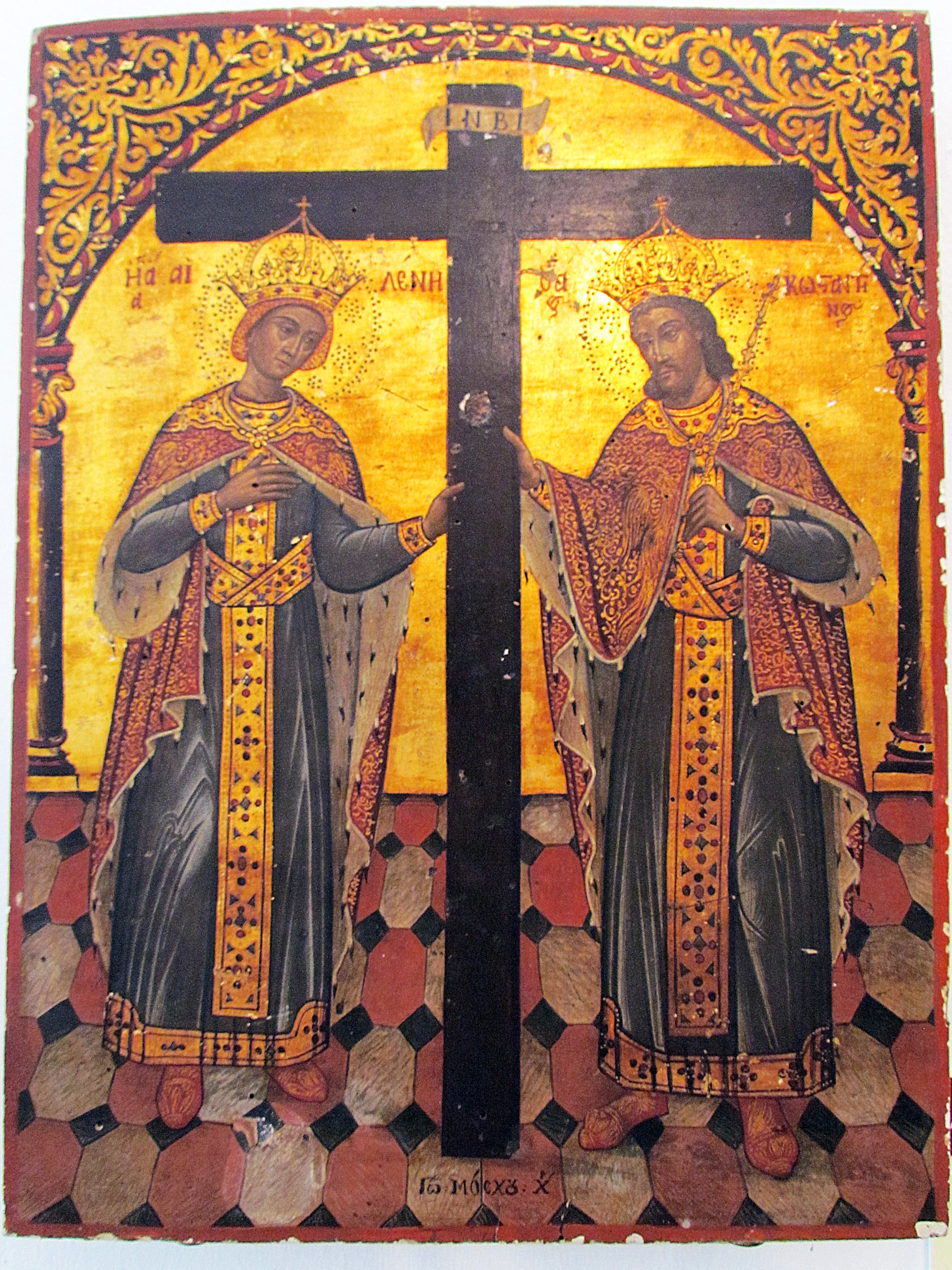
Konstantinos and Helena

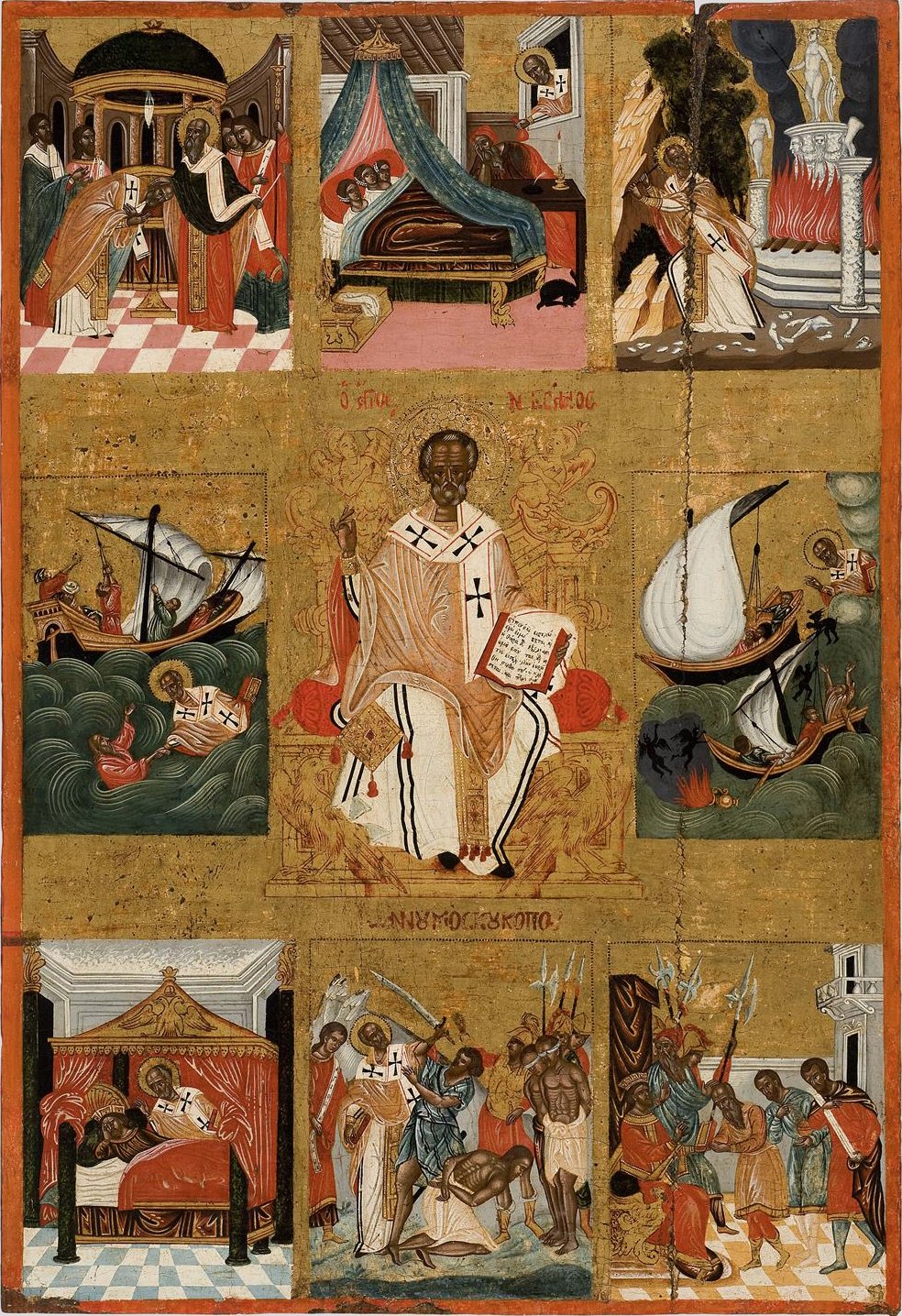
Saint Nicholas With Scenes From His Life

== Notable works ==
- Presentation of Jesus at the Temple Vatican Museum Vatican City
- Constantine and Helen (Moskos)Museum Cefalù Sicily Italy
- The Crucifixion (Moskos)
- The Dormition of the Virgin (Moskos)

== Bibliography ==
- Hatzidakis, Manolis; Drakopoulou, Evgenia (1997). Έλληνες Ζωγράφοι μετά την Άλωση (1450-1830). Τόμος 2: Καβαλλάρος - Ψαθόπουλος [Greek Painters after the Fall of Constantinople (1450-1830). Volume 2: Kavallaros - Psathopoulos]. Athens: Center for Modern Greek Studies, National Research Foundation. hdl:10442/14088. ISBN 960-7916-00-X.
