= Andreas Pavias =

Greek painter and educator (1440 – 1504/1512)

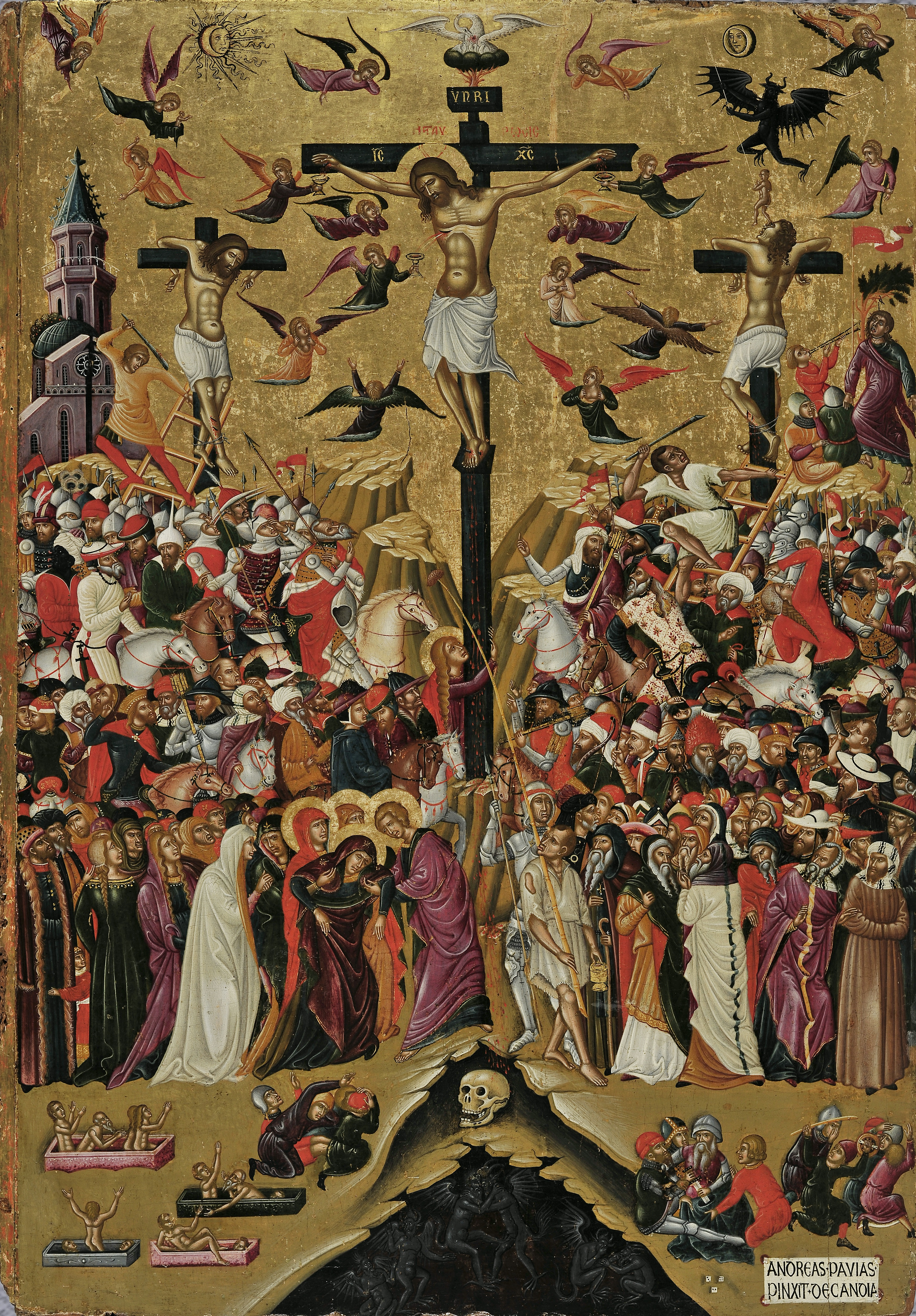
- Crucifixion of Jesus
- Born: 1440
- Died: 1504/1512
- Movement: Cretan school Late Gothic Italian
- Spouse: Marietta

Andreas Pavias (Greek: Ανδρέας Παβίας; 1440 – 1504/1512) was a Greek painter and educator, one of the founding fathers of the Cretan school. His works could be found in churches and private collections throughout Italy and Greece, where they influenced countless artists. Seven of these paintings survive today, six bearing Pavias's signature. The most famous of the group is The Crucifixion.

Pavias learned his craft from Angelos Akotantos, and was affiliated with Andreas Ritzos. He experimented with different techniques, and his paintings incorporate stylistic traits from the Venetian school. Angelos Pitzamanos was the student of Pavias, who also influenced the works of such Cretan school artists as Theodore Poulakis, Georgios Klontzas, and Michael Damaskenos.

== Early life ==
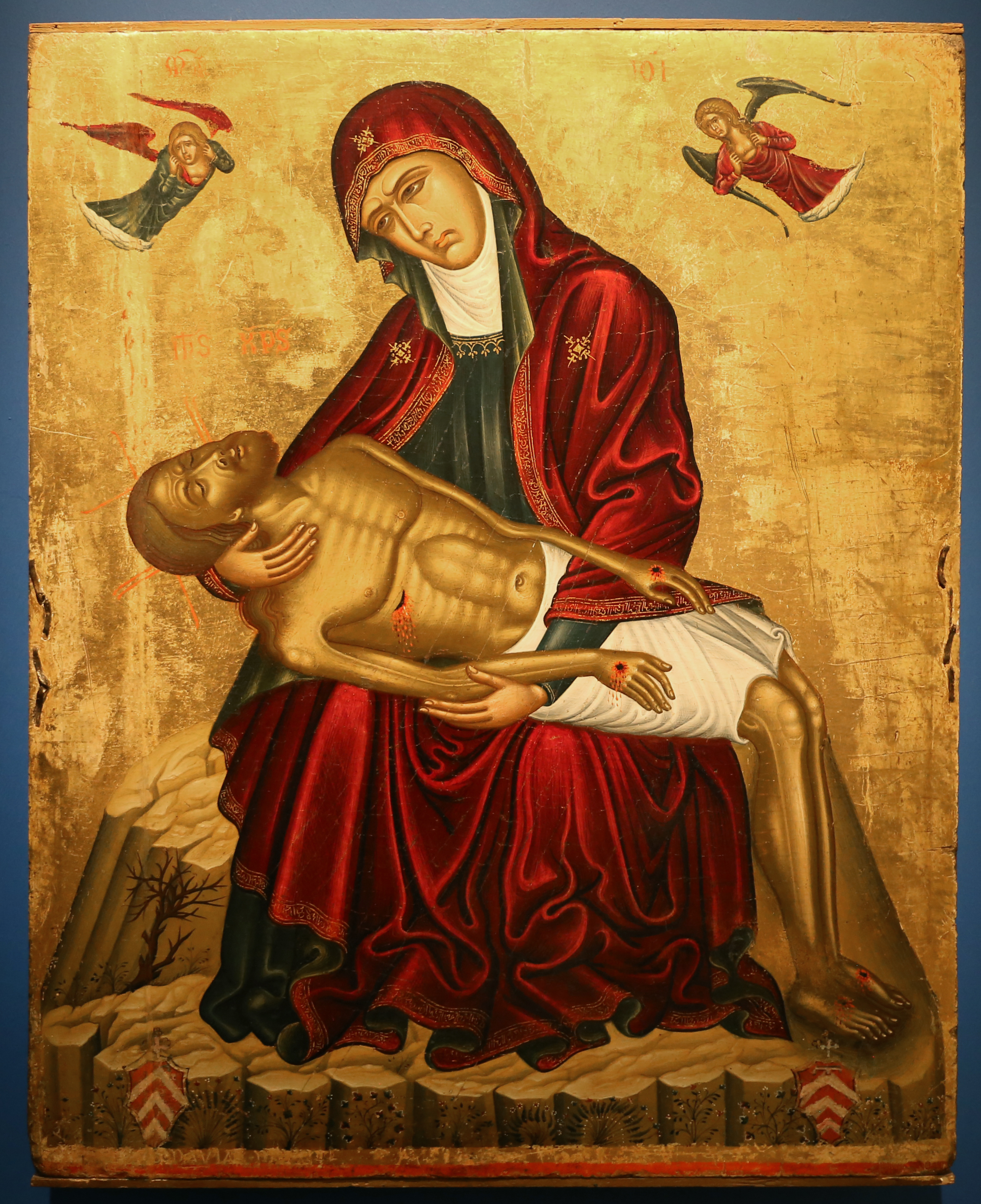
Lamentation of Christ

Pavias was born in Heraklion. His father's name was Petros and he was a priest. Pavia's wife's name was Maria or Marietta. He had a son named Athanasios he was a painter. Andreas also had an adoptive daughter named Agnes. Pavias studied painting under Angelos Akotantos. He was also recorded loaning money to painter Andreas Ritzos. Archival documents in Venice demonstrate that Pavias was involved in business deals in Heraklion in the years 1471, 1473, and 1479. On April 23, 1480, he was a witness and he signed the document magister Andreas Pavias, penctor. In 1481 he rented a house on Georgio Grin in Vourgo Candia Palaiochora.

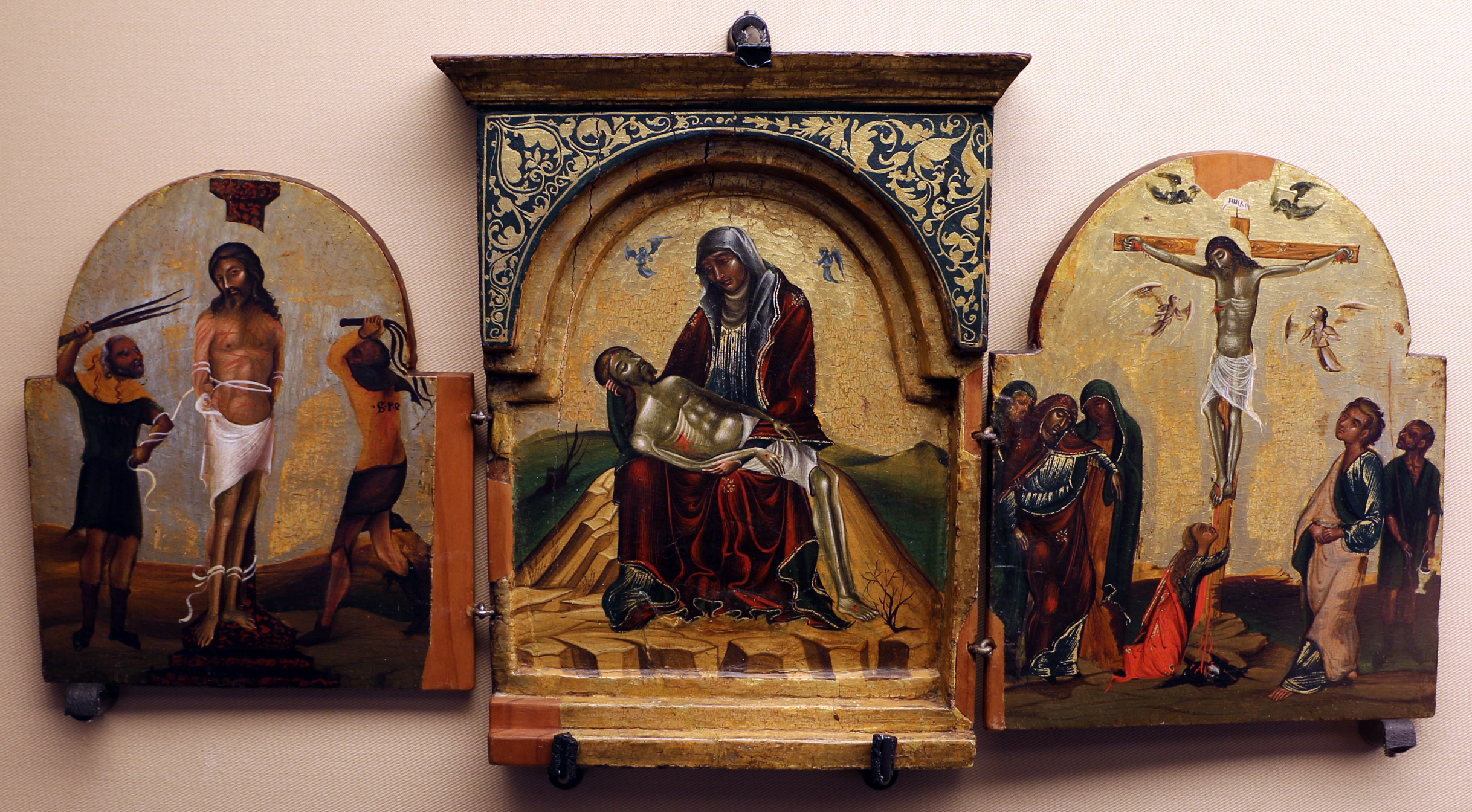
Triptych Scenes of the Passion, Resurrection, and Crucifixion

He was an art teacher he primarily taught icon painting. Records indicate in 1482 Angelo Pitzamanos's father signed a contract with Pavias to teach his son painting for five years. Pavias was considerably wealthy. Another document shows him purchasing selling and renting houses in Heraklion during the years 1482, 1483, 1486, and 1491. On October 24, 1492, he signed a five-year contract with Manousos Koukou to teach his son painting for five years.

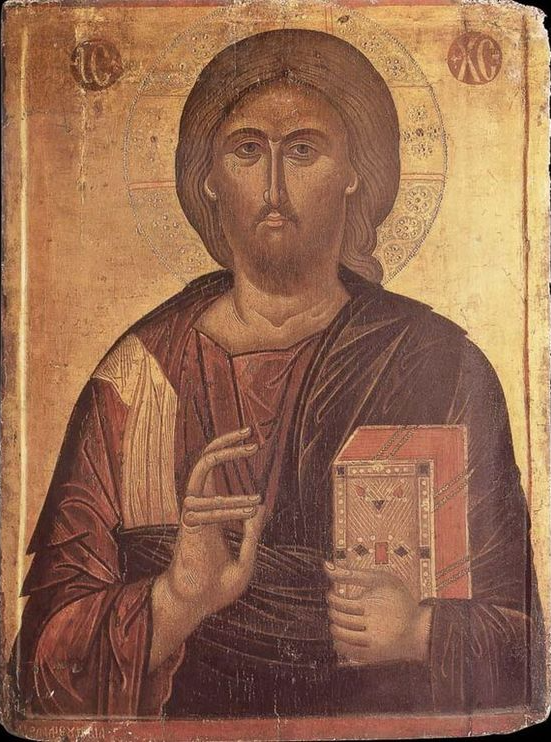
Christ Pantocrator

Catholic bishop Giovanni Battista Lagni commissioned a painting called Pieta (Lamentation of Christ) from Pavias between 1493 and 1505. The painting is currently in Rossano. On May 23, 1499, he signed a contract to teach Niccolo da Napoli painting for three years. Around the same period, he agreed to teach John Ploraio painting. On November 19, 1499, he signed a contract to teach a Jew named Aquilo Souloum. He agreed to teach her son painting, reading and writing for eight years. Around the same period, Pavias made out a will leaving his adoptive daughter Agnes a huge fortune. He gave her 500 iperpira, 10 gold doukata. Enough money to purchase a house in Chandaka (Heraklion) at that time. He also gave her gold, silver, gems, clothing, and jewelry.

On May 7, 1500, in a document, he requested his painting Nativity by famous painter Angelo to be returned. Pavias was involved with famous painter Marko Amarando. In 1504, he purchased a warehouse in Heraklion. The painter died by November 8, 1512, because a document refers to his wife as the widow Marietta. In 1514, she was the administrator of the estate, and she gave away part of the monastery of the Agios Pnevmatos (Holy Spirit). It was just outside of Vourgos Palaiochora.

== Notable works ==
- Agios Antonios, located (Korgialenio History and Folklore Museum)
- Kimisis of Ephrem the Syrian, located (Saint Constantine Church of the Holy Sepulchre
- Pieta, located Rossano Cathedral Italy
- Crucifixion, located National Gallery Athens
- XC, located Campo Santo Teutonico, Vatican City
- ΘΚ, located (Calligaris, Terzo d'Aquileia, Italy)

== See also ==
- The Crucifixion
- Maniera greca
- Ioannis Permeniates
- Konstantinos Paleokapas
- Georgios Nomikos

== Bibliography ==
- Hatzidakis, Manolis (1987). Έλληνες Ζωγράφοι μετά την Άλωση (1450-1830). Τόμος 1: Αβέρκιος - Ιωσήφ [Greek Painters after the Fall of Constantinople (1450-1830). Volume 1: Averkios - Iosif]. Athens: Center for Modern Greek Studies, National Research Foundation. hdl:10442/14844. ISBN 960-7916-01-8.
- Richardson, Carol M. (2007). Locating Renaissance Art. London UK: Yale University Press. p. 200.
- Hatzidakis, Manolis; Drakopoulou, Evgenia (1997). Έλληνες Ζωγράφοι μετά την Άλωση (1450-1830). Τόμος 2: Καβαλλάρος - Ψαθόπουλος [Greek Painters after the Fall of Constantinople (1450-1830). Volume 2: Kavallaros - Psathopoulos] (PDF). Athens: Center for Modern Greek Studies, National Research Foundation. hdl:10442/14088. ISBN 960-7916-00-X.
- Drakopoulou, Evgenia (2010). Έλληνες Ζωγράφοι μετά την Άλωση (1450–1830). Τόμος 3: Αβέρκιος - Ιωσήφ [Greek Painters after the Fall of Constantinople (1450–1830). Volume 3: Averkios - Joseph]. Athens, Greece: Center for Modern Greek Studies, National Research Foundation. ISBN 978-960-7916-94-5.
