= Crucifixion in the arts =

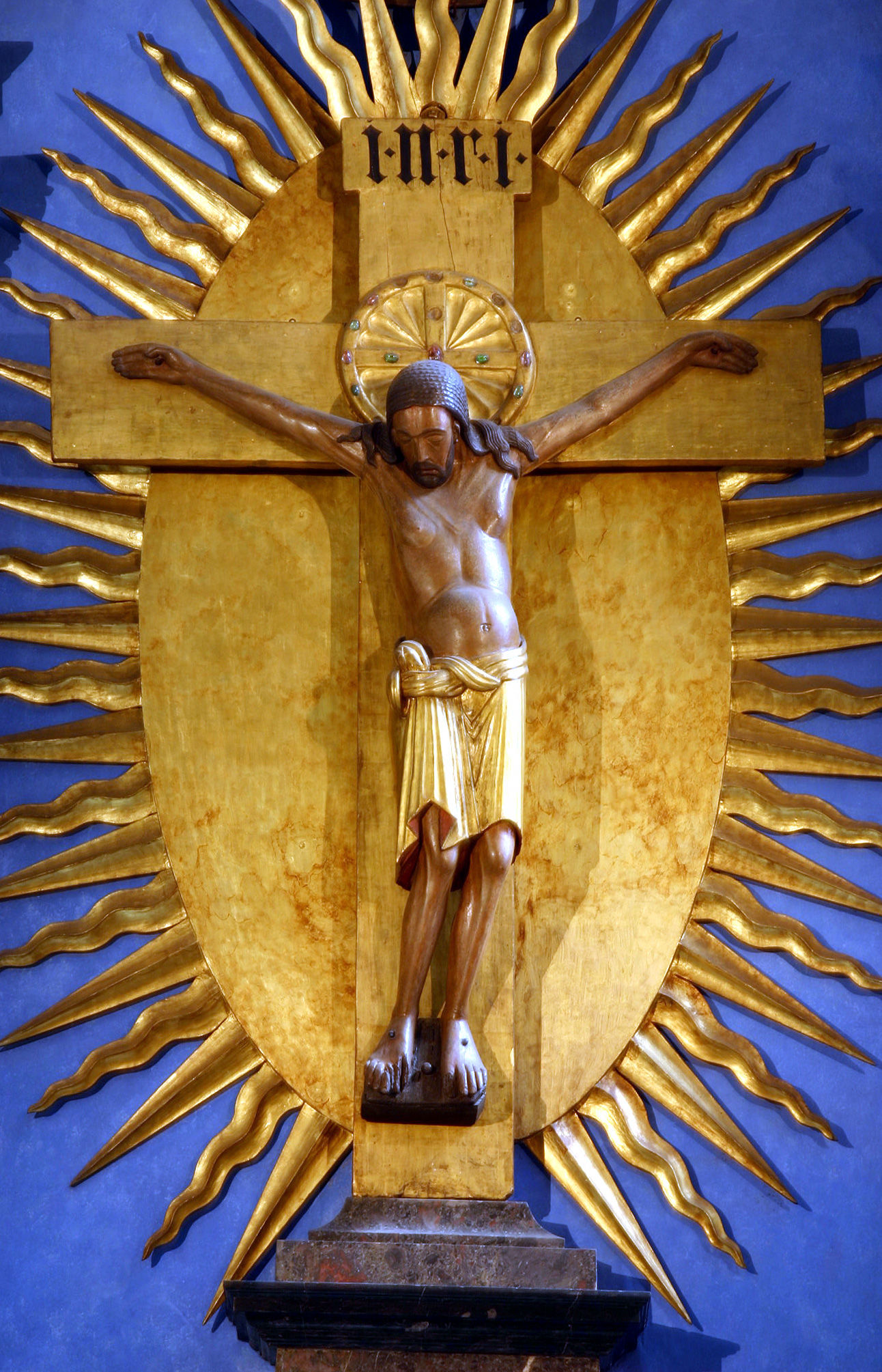
Gero Cross, late 10th century, Cologne Cathedral, Germany

Crucifixions and crucifixes have appeared in the arts and popular culture from before the era of the pagan Roman Empire. The crucifixion of Jesus has been depicted in a wide range of religious art since the 4th century CE, frequently including the appearance of mournful onlookers such as the Virgin Mary, Pontius Pilate, and angels, as well as antisemitic depictions portraying Jews as responsible for Christ's death. Modern art and culture have also seen the rise of images of crucifixion being used to make statements unconnected with Christian iconography, or even just used for shock value.

== Art ==
=== Late antiquity ===
The earliest known artistic representations of crucifixion predate the Christian era, including Greek representations of mythical crucifixions inspired by the use of the punishment by the Persians.

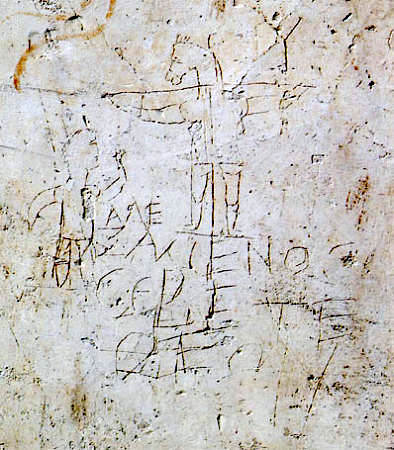
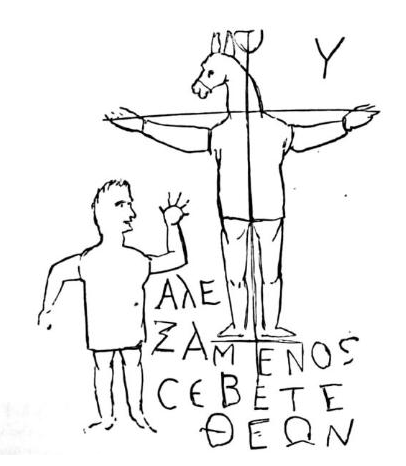
The Alexamenos graffito, an early depiction of crucifixion (left), and a modern-day tracing (right)

The Alexamenos graffito, currently in the museum in the Palatine Hill, Rome, is a Roman graffito from the 2nd century CE which depicts a man worshiping a crucified donkey. This graffito, though apparently meant as an insult, is the earliest known pictorial representation of the crucifixion of Jesus. The text scrawled around the image reads in Greek Αλεξαμενος ϲεβετε θεον, which approximately translates to "Alexamenos worships God".

In the first three centuries of Early Christian art, the crucifixion was rarely depicted. Some engraved gems thought to be 2nd or 3rd century have survived, but the subject does not appear in the art of the Catacombs of Rome, and it is thought that at this period the image was restricted to heretical groups of Christians. The earliest Western images clearly originating in the mainstream of the church are 5th-century, including the scene on the doors of Santa Sabina, Rome. Constantine I forbade crucifixion as a method of execution, and early church leaders regarded crucifixion with horror, and thus, as an unfit subject for artistic portrayal.

The purported discovery of the True Cross by Constantine's mother, Helena, and the development of Golgotha as a site for pilgrimage, together with the dispersal of fragments of the relic across the Christian world, led to a change of attitude. It was probably in Syria Palaestina that the image developed, and many of the earliest depictions are on the Monza ampullae, small metal flasks for holy oil, that were pilgrim's souvenirs from the Holy Land, as well as 5th-century ivory reliefs from Italy. Prior to the Middle Ages, early Christians preferred to focus on the "triumphant" Christ, rather than a dying one, because the concept of the risen Christ was so central to their faith. The plain cross became depicted, often as a "glorified" symbol, as the crux gemmata, covered with jewels, as many real early medieval processional crosses in goldsmith work were.

=== Eastern church ===
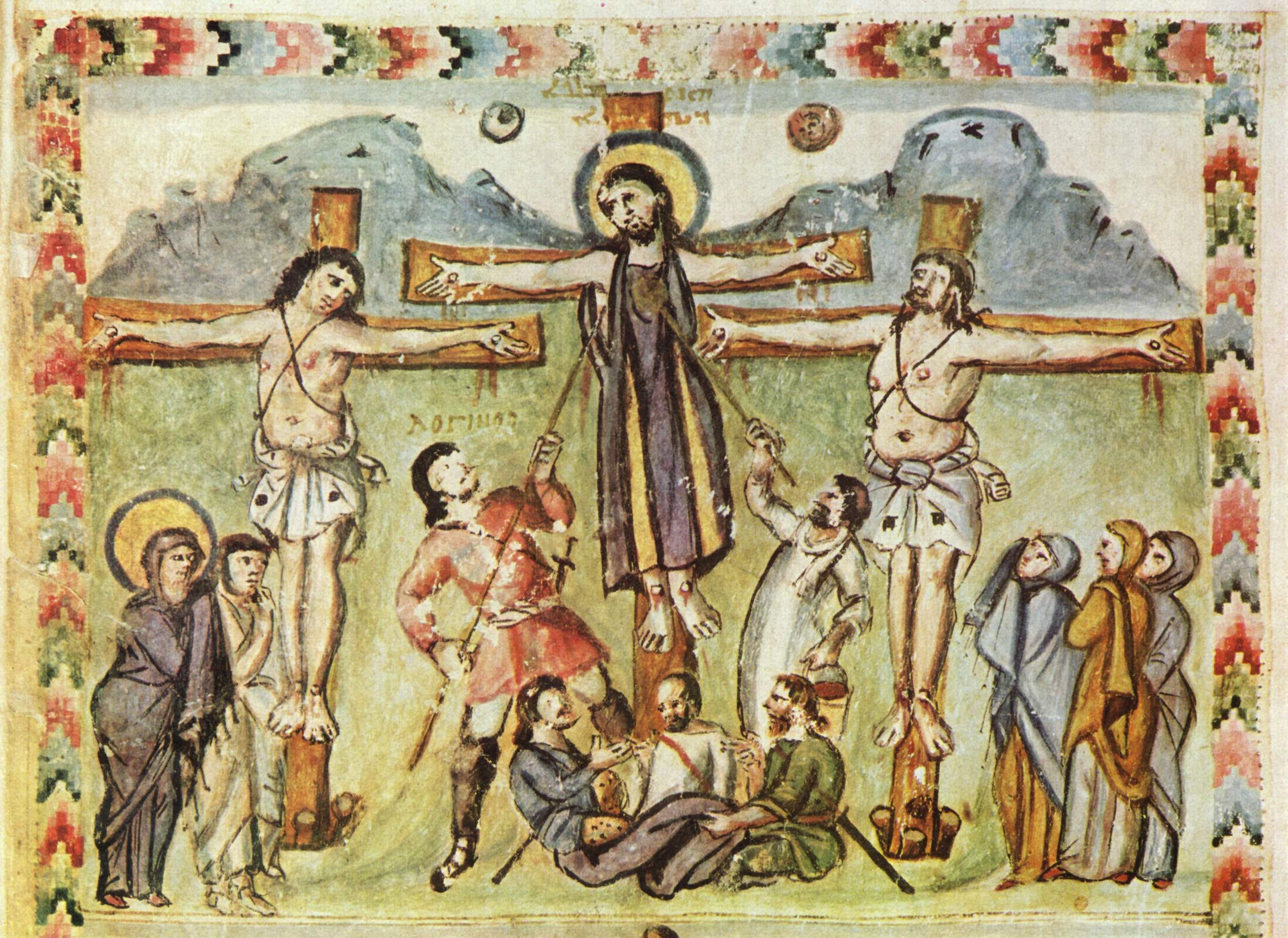
The earliest crucifixion in an illuminated manuscript, from the Syriac Rabbula Gospels, 586 CE

Early depictions showed a living Christ, and tended to minimize the appearance of suffering, so as to draw attention to the positive message of resurrection and faith, rather than to the physical realities of execution. In the early history of the church in Ireland, important events were often commemorated by erecting pillars with elaborate crucifixes carved into them, such as where Saint Patrick, returning as a missionary bishop, saw the place he was held captive in his youth.

Early Byzantine depictions such as that in the Rabbula Gospels often show Christ flanked by Longinus and Stephaton with their spear and pole with vinegar. According to the gospels, the vinegar was offered just before Christ died, and the lance used just after, so the presence of the two flanking figures symbolizes the "double reality of God and man in Christ". In images from after the end of the Byzantine Iconoclasm, Christ is shown as dead, but his "body is undamaged and there is no expression of pain"; the Eastern church held that Christ's body was invulnerable. The S-shaped slumped body type was developed in the 11th century. These images were one of the complaints against Constantinople given by Rome in the Great Schism of 1054, although the Gero Cross in Cologne is probably nearly a century older.

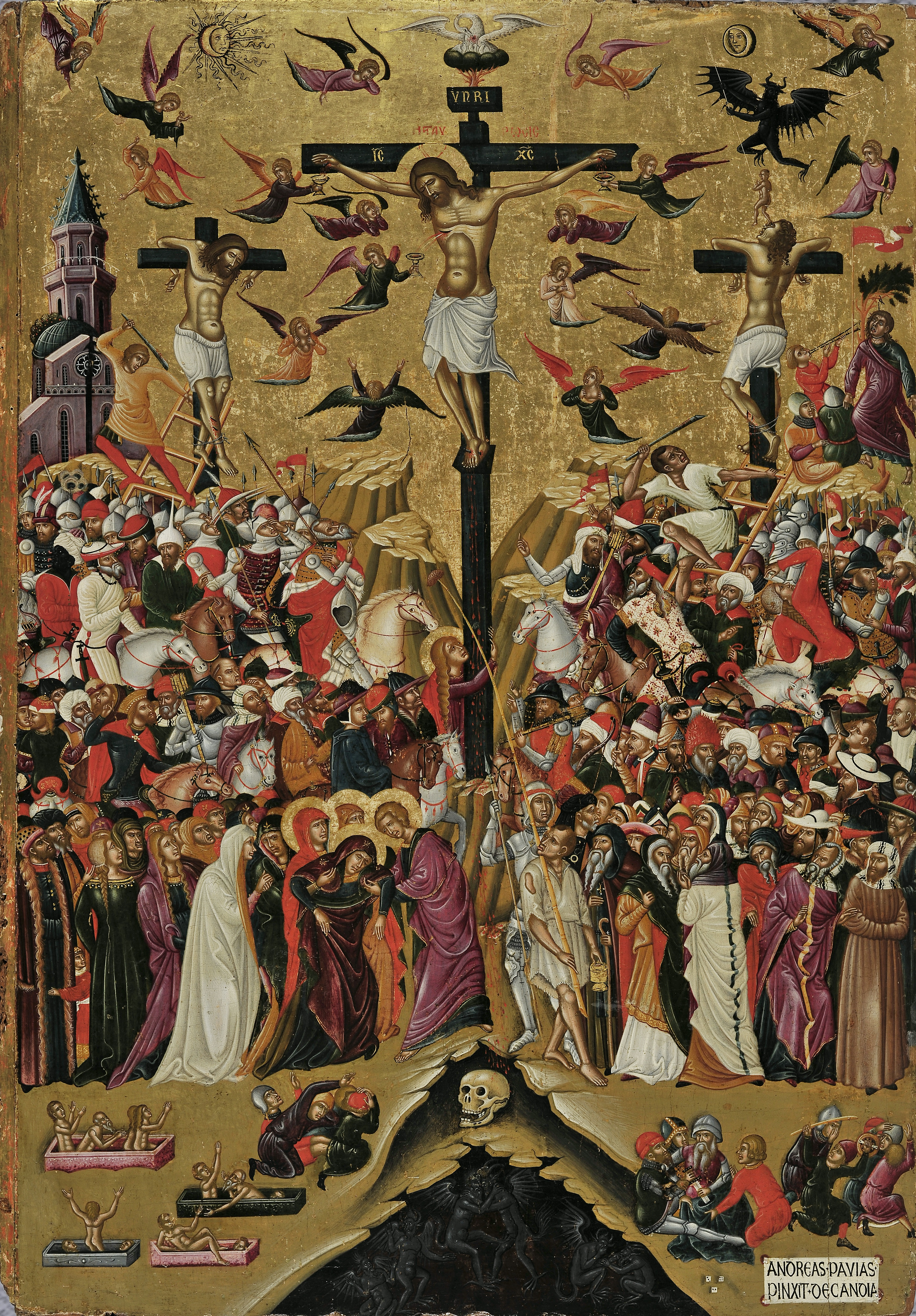
Andreas Pavias, The Impenitent thief to our right, late 1400s

Greek painters from Constantinople heavily influenced Italian Byzantine art. Nikolaos Philanthropinos, Theophanes of Constantinople, and Apollonios were active in the Venetian Empire and taught painting. Philanthropinos painted St Mark's Basilica after the fire in the 1430s.

Crete became the epicenter of Greek painting during the Renaissance and Baroque eras the style became known as the Cretan school of painting. Countless painters depicted the Crucifixion. Their work was heavily influenced by Venetian painting but followed the Greek mannerism prevalent at the time known as the Maniera Greca. Andreas Pavias uniquely depicted the Crucifixion following a gothic style and the painter depicted the impenitent thief turned around with his back facing the viewers to denote the difference between the two historical biblical figures.

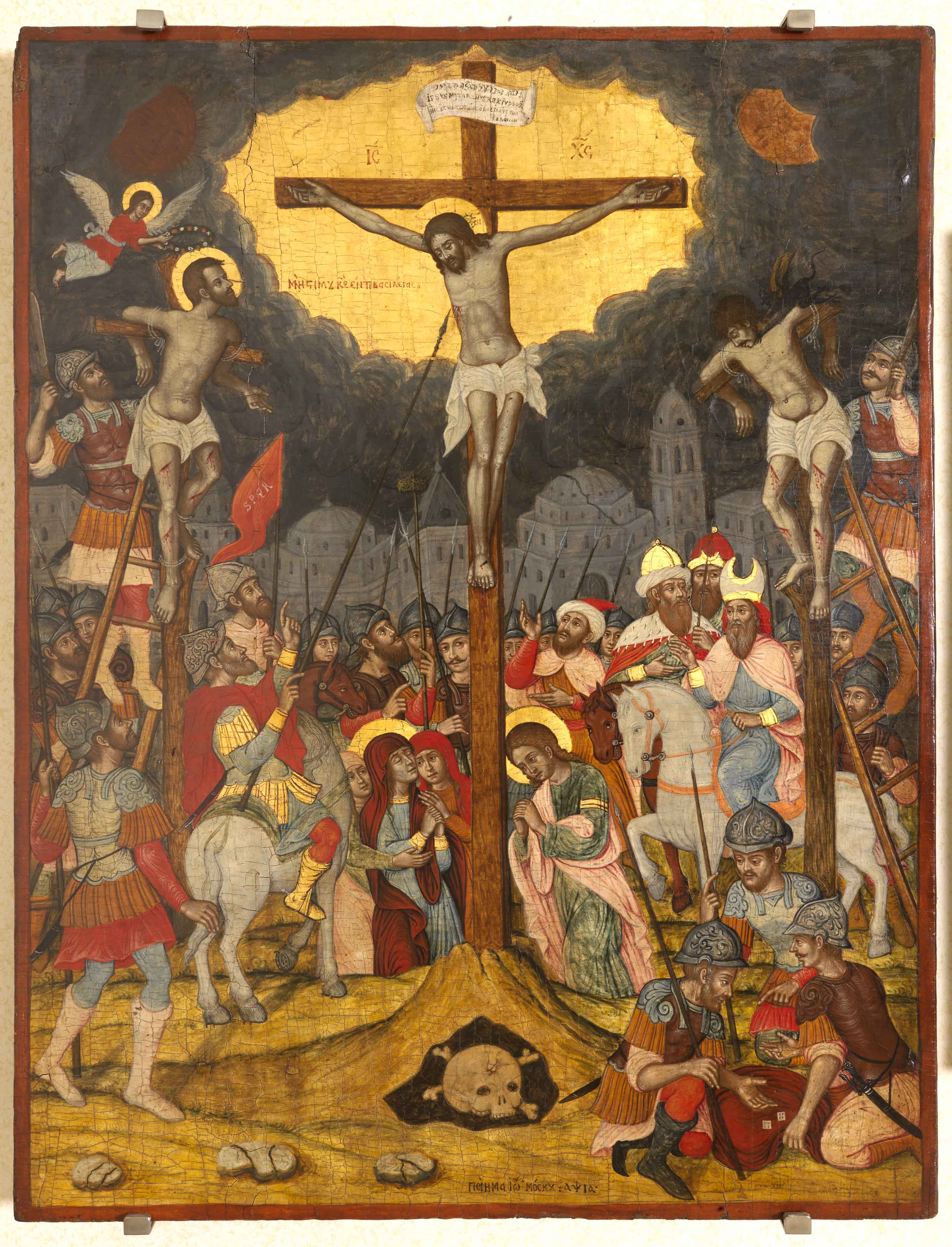
Ioannis Moskos Crucifixion, 1711

Other Cretan painters followed his style Theophanes the Cretan depicted the reversed figure in his Crucifixion fresco at Stavronikita Monastery on Mount Athos, Greece. Emmanuel Lambardos also continued the style in his Crucifixion.

By the mid-1600s, Konstantinos Paleokapas completed his work entitled The Crucifixion following the traditional Maniera Greca. A mixture of Venetian painting and the traditional Greek Byzantine Style influenced the paintings but new colors were added painters chose to use gold-gilded backgrounds while also modernizing the dimensionality of the figures. Around 1647, Georgios Margkazinis finished his version of The Crucifixion (Margkazinis) which was an oil painting on limestone for San Giorgio dei Greci. The painter chose to emulate the Passion of Jesus a work by Jan Sadeler I a Flemish engraver. Greek painters in the Venetian world began to follow the new style. Another notable painting that falls between the late Cretan school and Heptanese school is The Crucifixion (Moskos) by Ioannis Moskos painted in 1711.

=== Western church ===
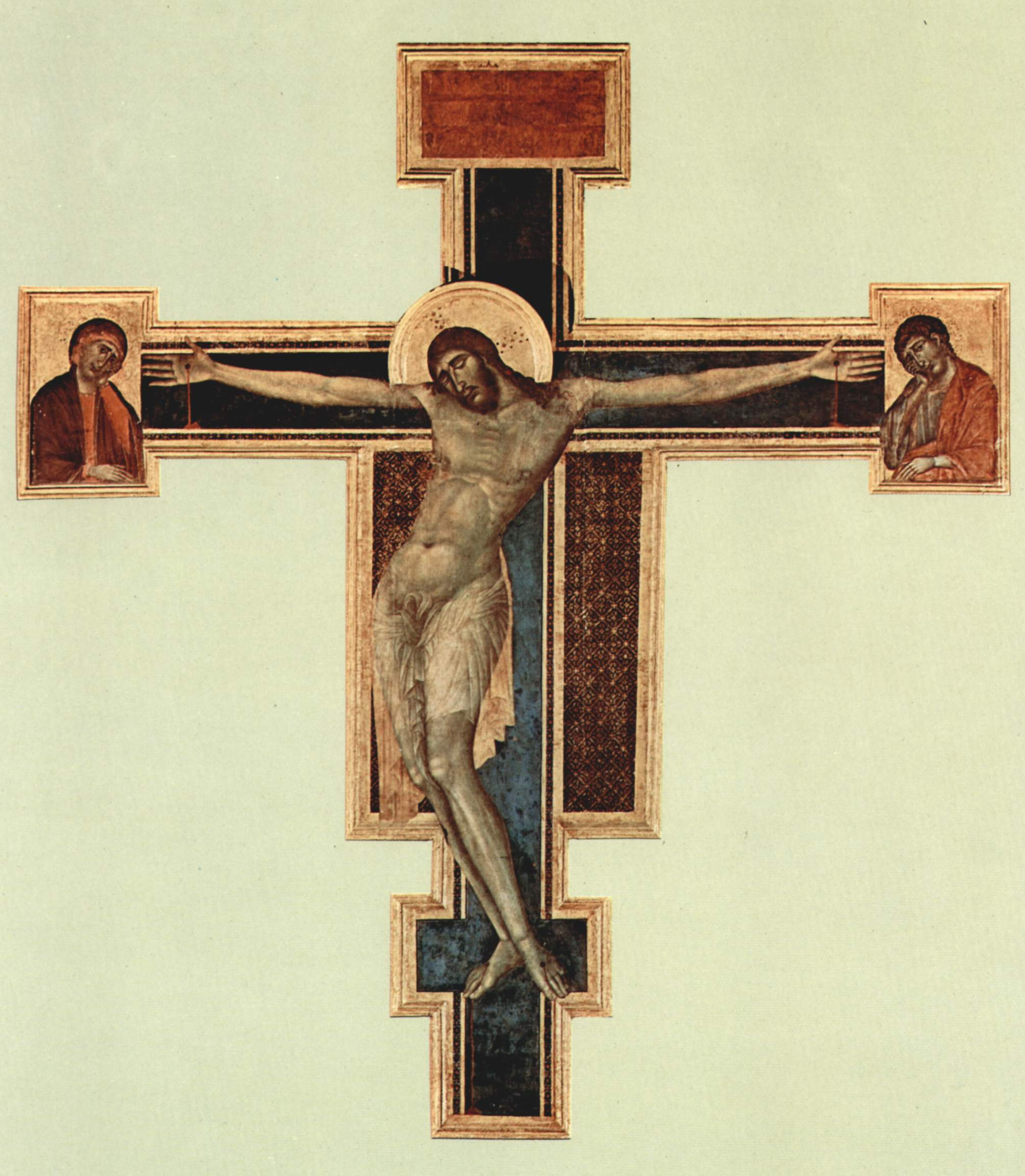
Santa Croce Crucifix, 448 cm × 390 cm (176.4 in × 153.5 in), by Cimabue, Florence, 1287–1288

The earliest Western images of a dead Christ may be in the Utrecht Psalter, probably before 835. Other early Western examples include the Gero Cross and the reverse of the Cross of Lothair, both from the end of the 10th century. The first of these is the earliest near life-size sculpted cross to survive, and in its large scale represents "suffering in its extreme physical consequences", a trend that was to continue in the West. Such figures, especially as roods, large painted or sculpted crucifixes hung high in front of the chancel of churches, became very important in Western art, providing a sharp contrast with Eastern Orthodox traditions, where the subject was never depicted in monumental sculpture, and increasingly rarely even in small Byzantine ivories. By contrast, an altar cross, almost always a crucifix, became compulsory in Western churches in the Middle Ages. That it should be a crucifix was first specified in the Roman Missal of 1570 and small wall-mounted crucifixes were increasingly popular in Catholic homes from the Counter-Reformation, if not before. The image of a crucifix that bled when mocked and struck by Jews also gained popularity during this time.

As a broad generalization, the earliest depictions, before about 900, tended to show all three crosses (those of Jesus, the Good Thief and the Bad Thief), but later medieval depictions mostly showed just Jesus and his cross. From the Renaissance either type might be shown. The number of other figures shown depended on the size and medium of the work, but there was a similar trend for early depictions to show a number of figures, giving way in the High Middle Ages to just the Virgin Mary and Saint John the Evangelist, shown standing on either side of the cross, as in the Stabat Mater depictions, or sculpted or painted on panels at the end of each arm of a rood cross.

The soldiers were less likely to be shown, but others of the party with Mary and John might be. Angels were often shown in the sky, and the Hand of God in some early depictions gave way to a small figure of God the Father in the heavens in some later ones, those these were always in the minority. Other elements that might be included were the sun and moon (evoking the darkening of the heavens at the moment of Christ's death), and Ecclesia and Synagoga. There were also representations of the alleged aggressors, including depictions of Jews mocking, glaring, slapping, and ultimately crucifying Jesus. Although according to the Gospel accounts his clothing was removed from Jesus before his crucifixion, most artists have thought it proper to represent his lower body as draped in some way. In one type of sculpted crucifix, of which the Volto Santo in Lucca is the classic example, Christ continued to wear the long collobium robe of the Rabbula Gospels. The motif of the Pelican in her Piety – a mother pelican plucking flesh from her breast to feed her chicks – appears at the top of the cross in many medieval crucifixion scenes. The mother pelican signifies Jesus, sacrificing his flesh for man's (the chicks') salvation.

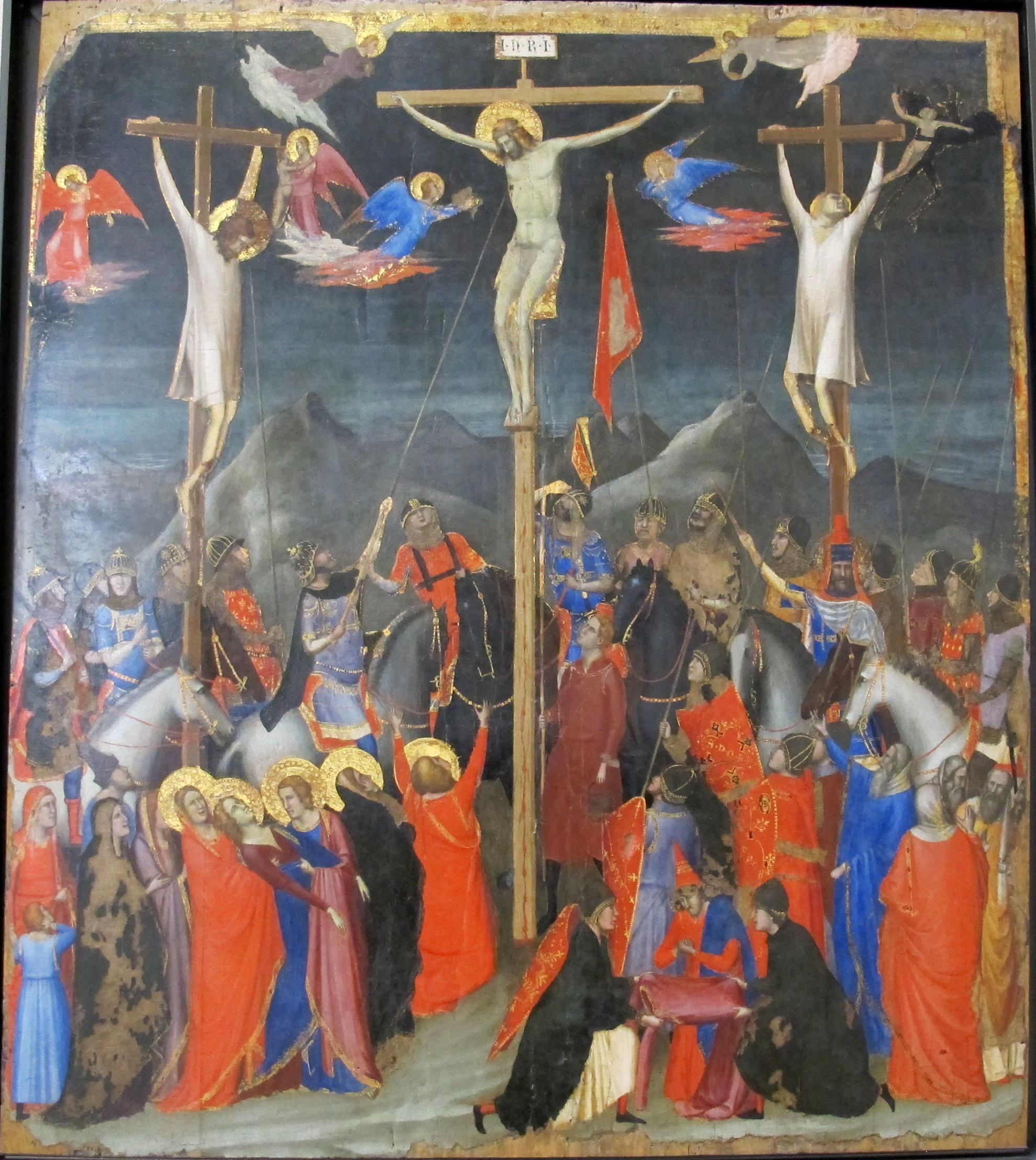
A crowded Gothic narrative treatment, workshop of Giotto, c. 1330

In the Gothic period more elaborate narrative depictions developed, including many extra figures of Mary Magdalene, disciples, especially The Three Marys behind the Virgin Mary, soldiers often including an officer on a horse, and angels in the sky. The moment when Longinus the centurion pierces Christ with his spear (the "Holy Lance") is often shown, and the blood and water spurting from Christ's side is often caught in a chalice held by an angel. In larger images the other two crosses might return, but most often not. In some works donor portraits were included in the scene. Such depictions begin in the late 12th century, and become common where space allows in the 13th century.

Related scenes such as the Deposition of Christ, Entombment of Christ and Nailing of Christ to the Cross developed. In the Late Middle Ages, increasingly intense and realistic representations of suffering were shown, paired with increasingly grotesque and malicious depictions of Pontius Pilate and the allegedly murderous Jews, reflecting the development of highly emotional andachtsbilder subjects and devotional trends such as German mysticism; some, like the Throne of Mercy, Man of Sorrows and Pietà, related to the Crucifixion. The same trend affected the depiction of other figures, notably in the "Swoon of the Virgin", who is very commonly shown fainting in paintings of between 1300 and 1500, though this depiction was attacked by theologians in the 16th century, and became unusual. After typically more tranquil depictions during the Italian Renaissance—though not its Northern equivalent, which produced works such as the Isenheim Altarpiece—there was a return to intense emotionalism in the Baroque, in works such as Peter Paul Rubens's Elevation of the Cross.

The scene always formed part of a cycle of images of the Life of Christ after about 600 (though it is noticeably absent before) and usually in one of the Life of the Virgin; the presence of Saint John made it a common subject for altarpieces in churches dedicated to him. From the late Middle Ages various new contexts for images were devised, from such large scale monuments as the "calvaire" of Brittany and the Sacri Monti of Piedmont and Lombardy to the thousands of small wayside shrines found in many parts of Catholic Europe, and the Stations of the Cross in the majority of Catholic churches.

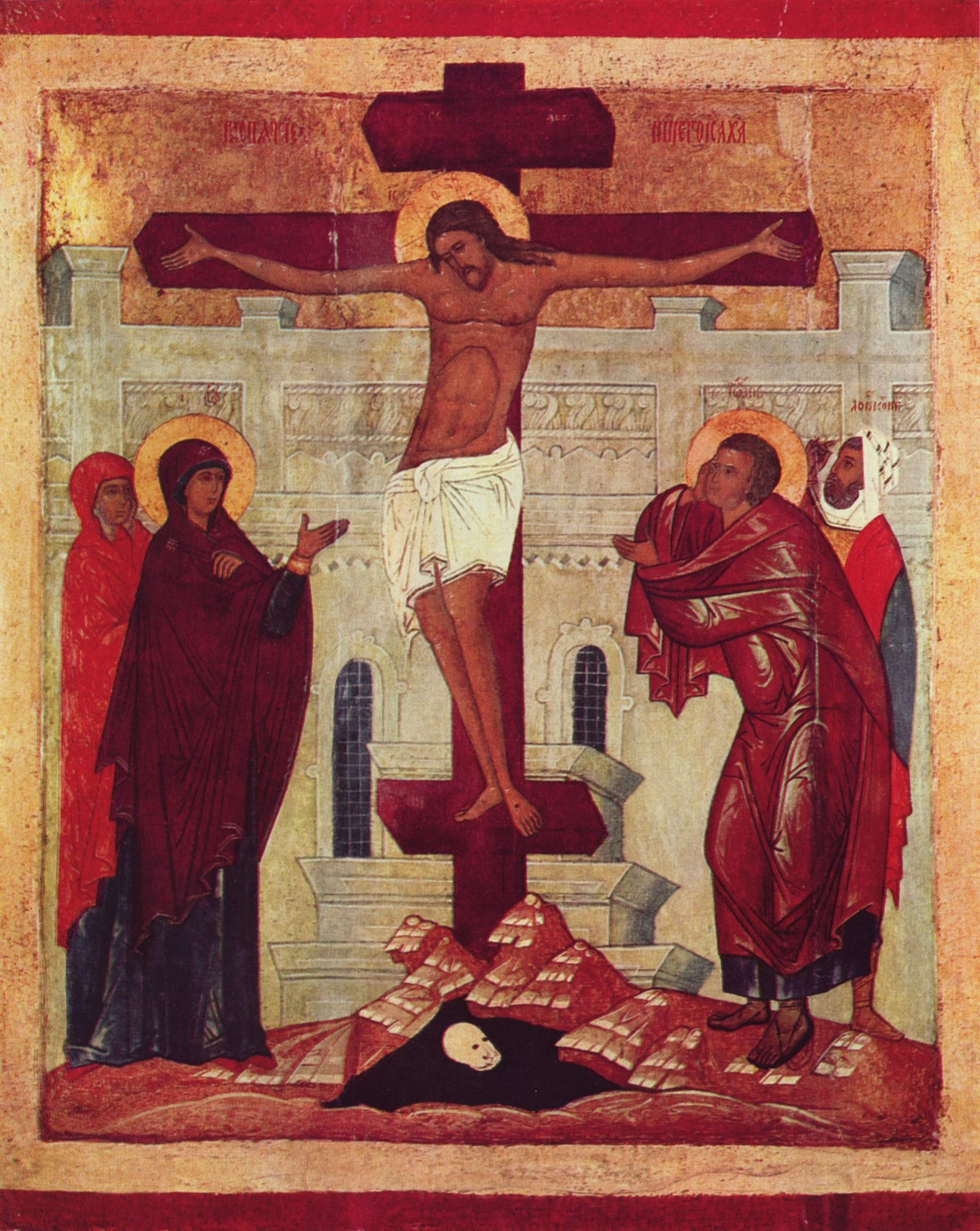
Russian Orthodox depiction of crucifixion by a painter of the Novgorod school, 1360

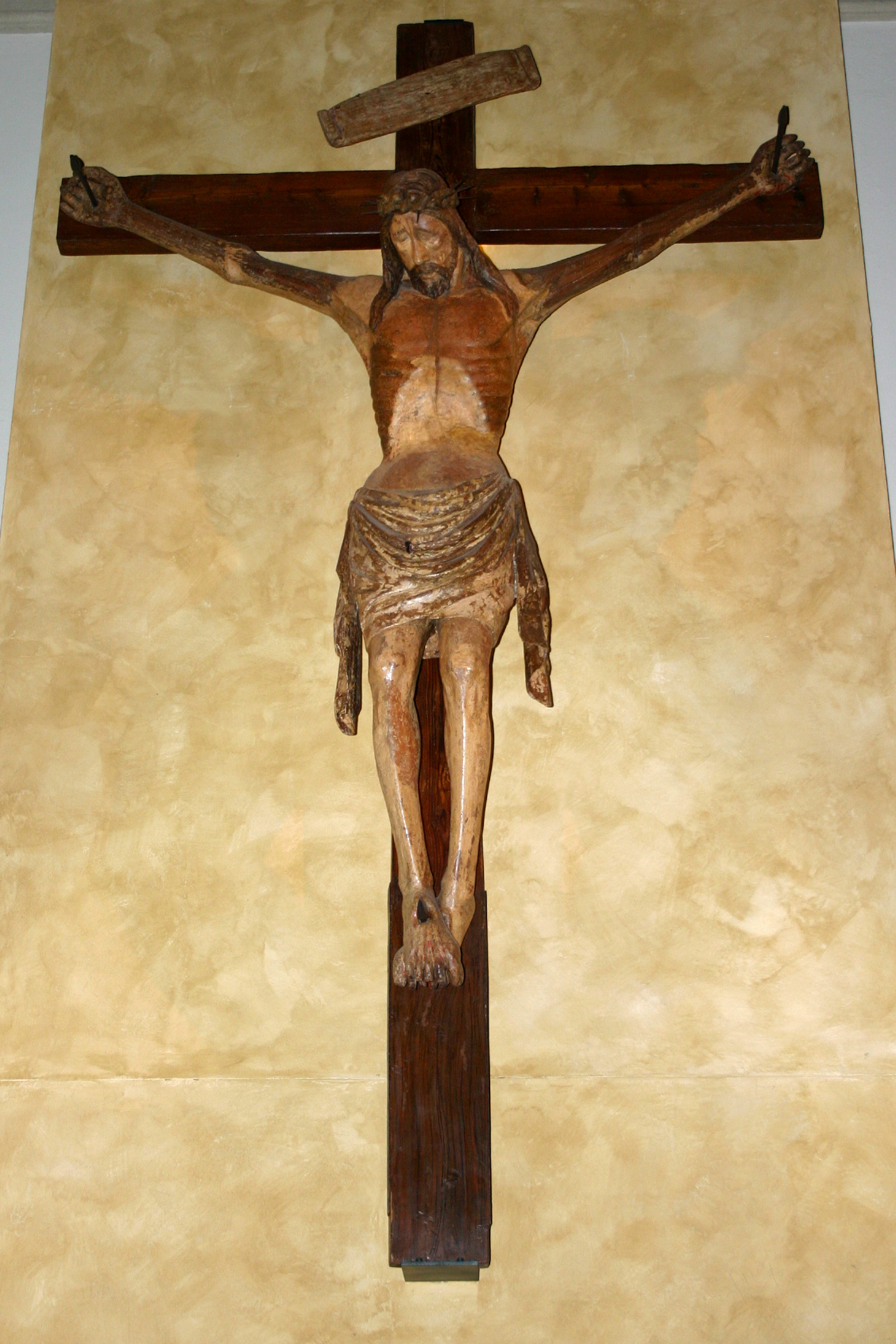
14th-century wood crucifix, Milan

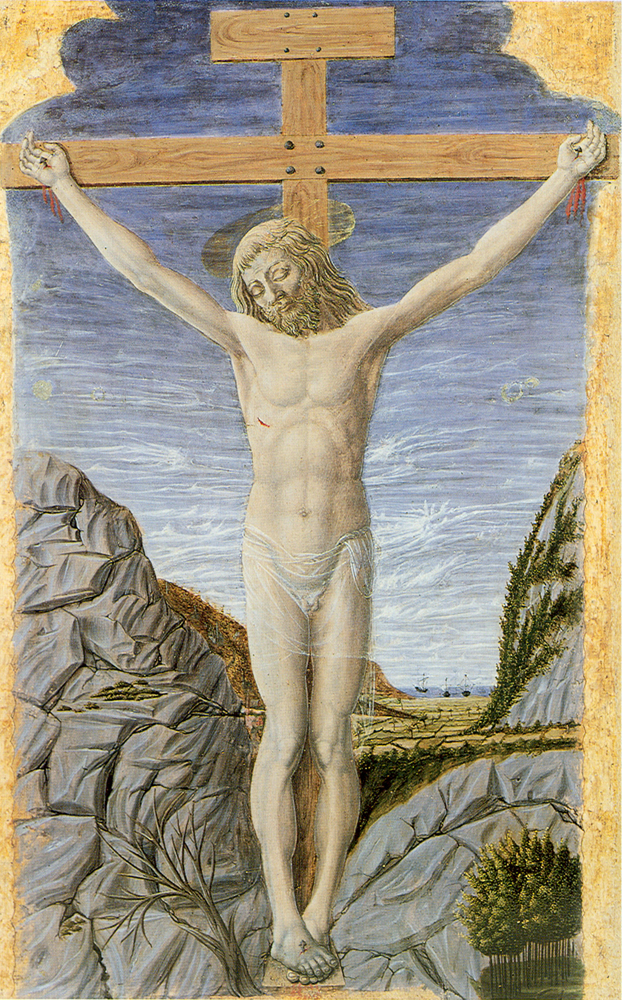
Christ on the Cross by Fra Carnevale, circa 1445–1467

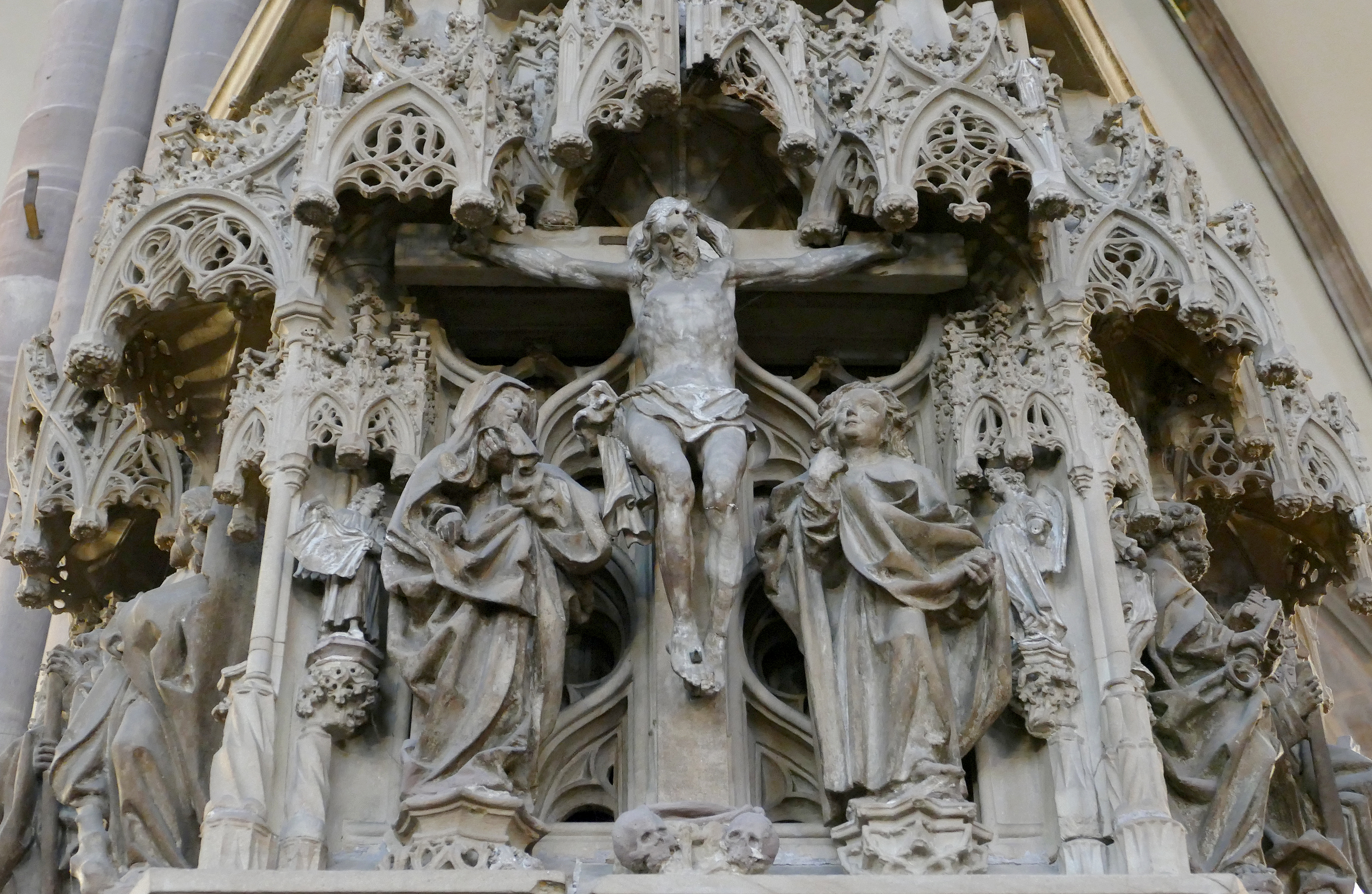
Crucifix on the pulpit of Strasbourg Cathedral, 1485

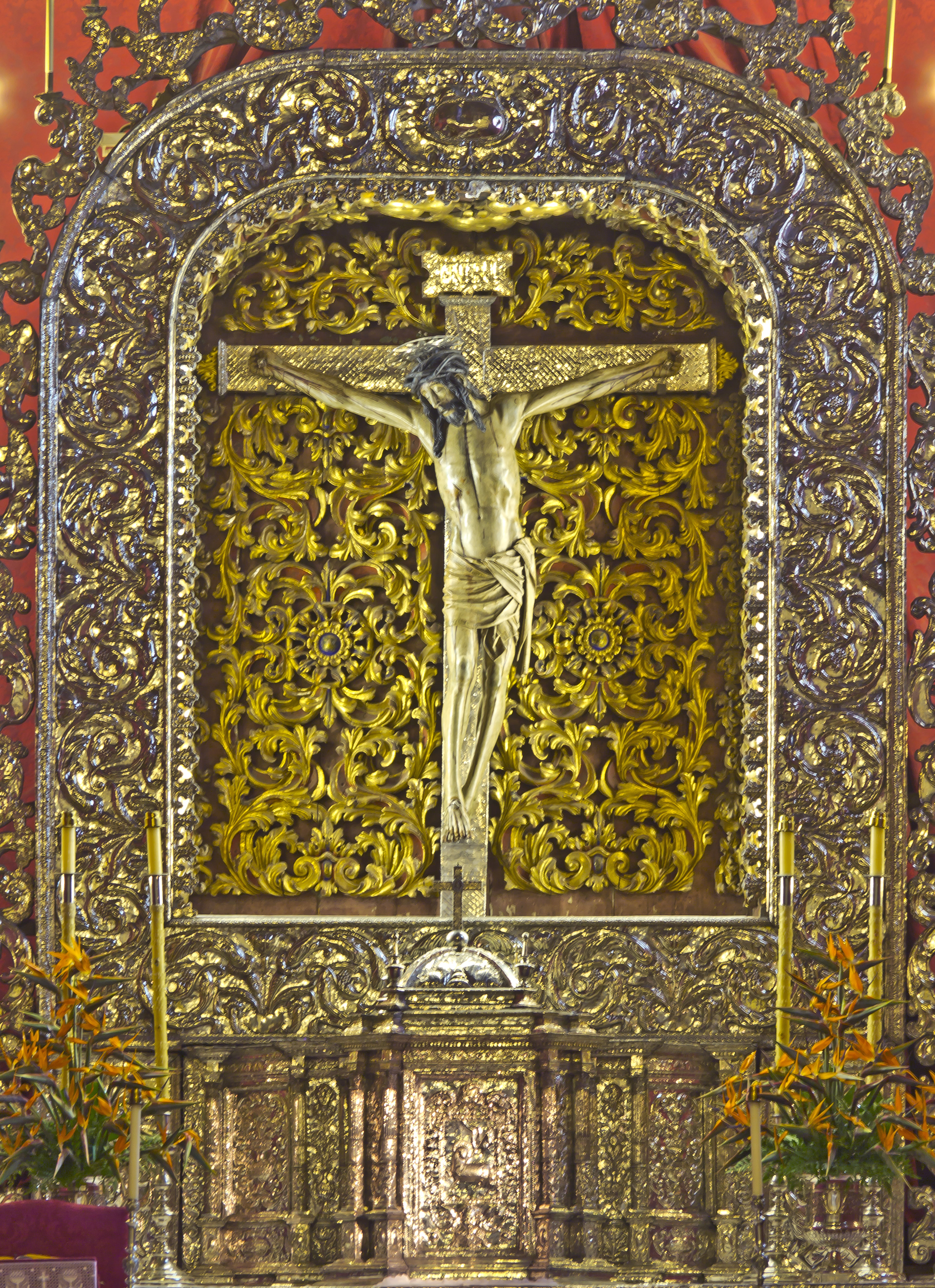
Cristo de La Laguna, Flemish-Brabanzon origin, 1510–14. Real Santuario del Cristo de La Laguna, San Cristóbal de La Laguna

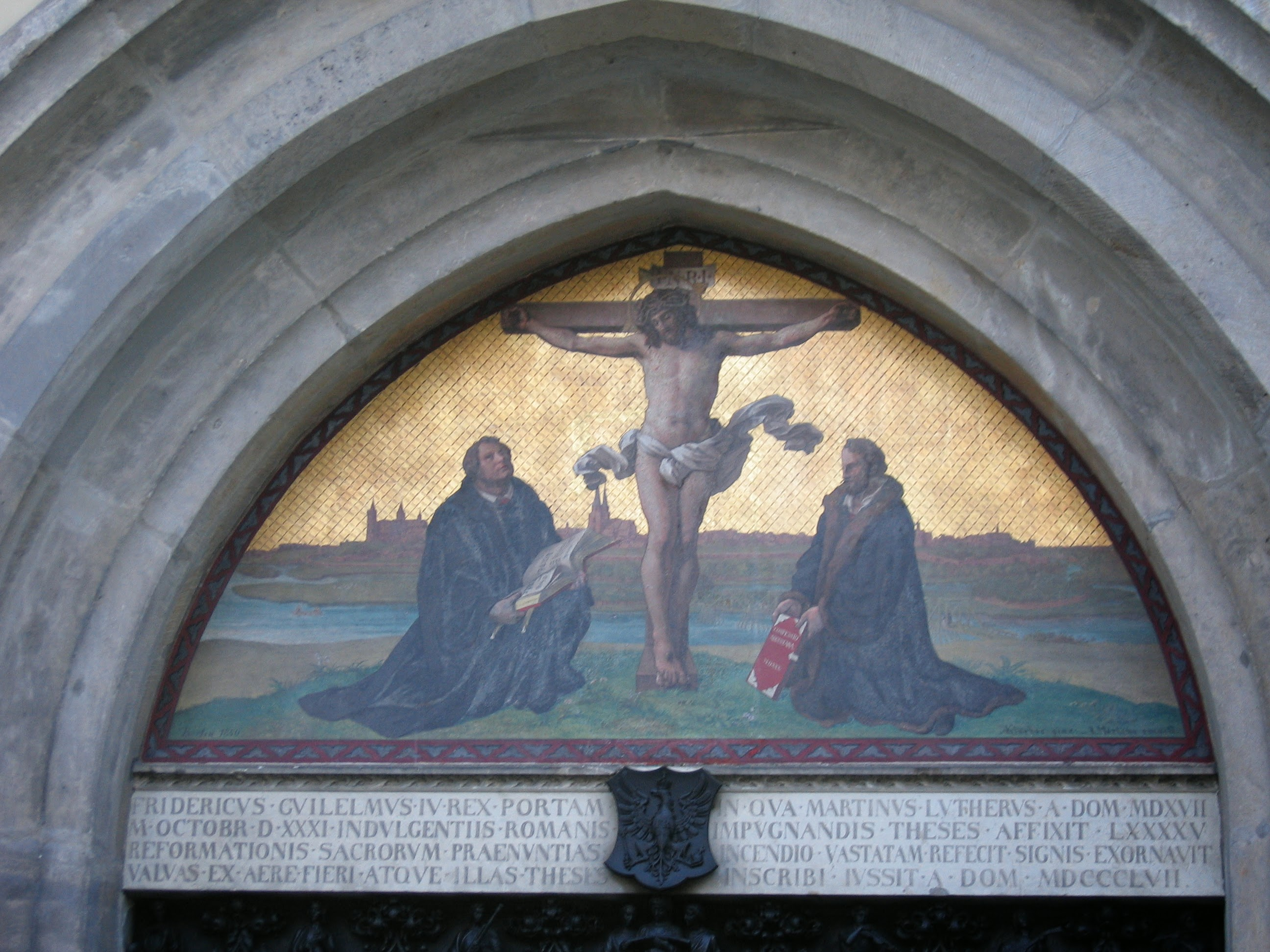
The tympanum of the Thesis Door at the Castle Church in Wittenberg depicts Martin Luther and Philip Melanchthon kneeling in prayer, facing the crucified Christ.

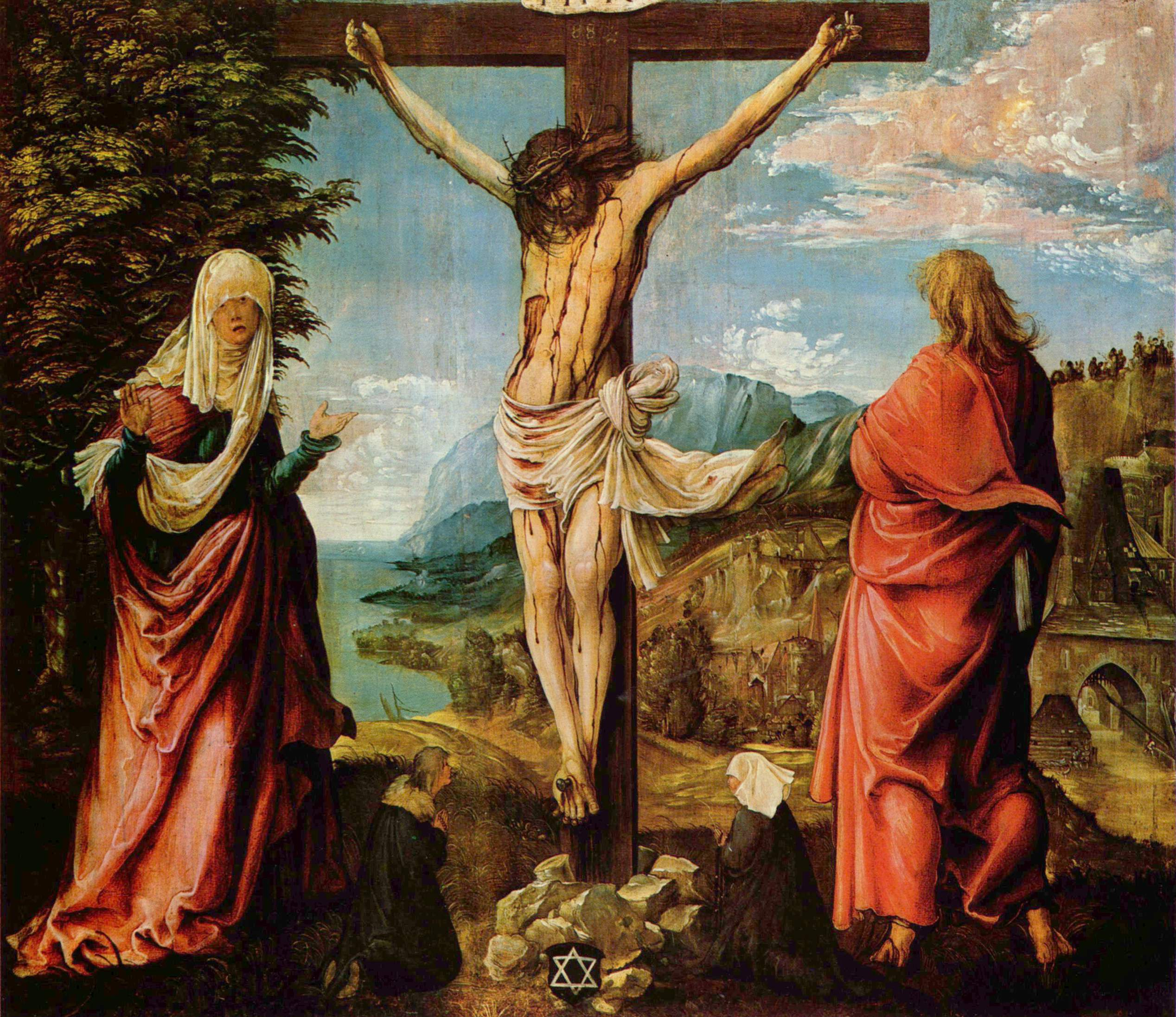
Crucifixion by Albrecht Altdorfer, circa 1514–1516, with tiny donor couple among the feet of the main figures

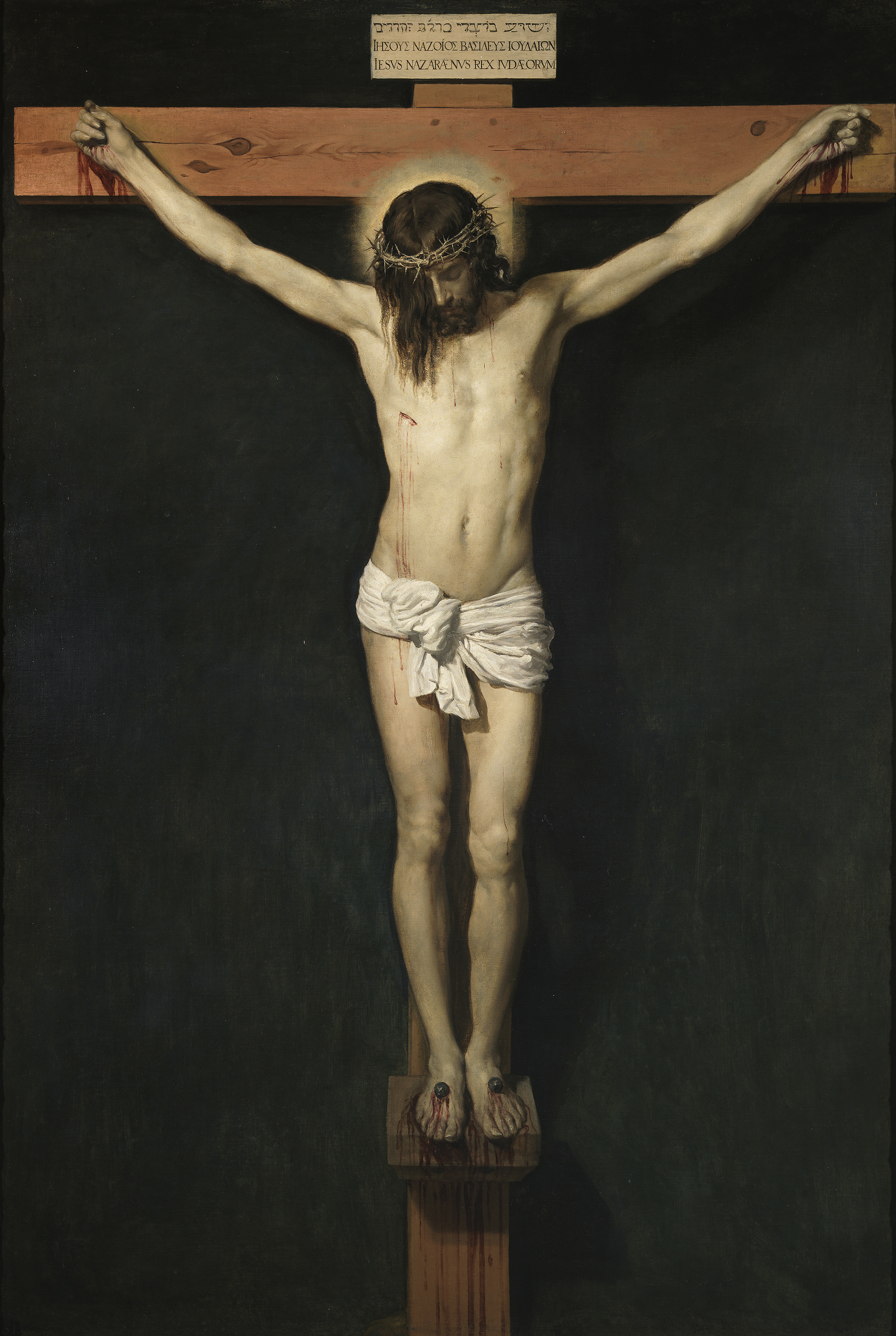
Cristo crucificado by Diego Velázquez, 1632, showing a Baroque return to realism and emotion in the depiction

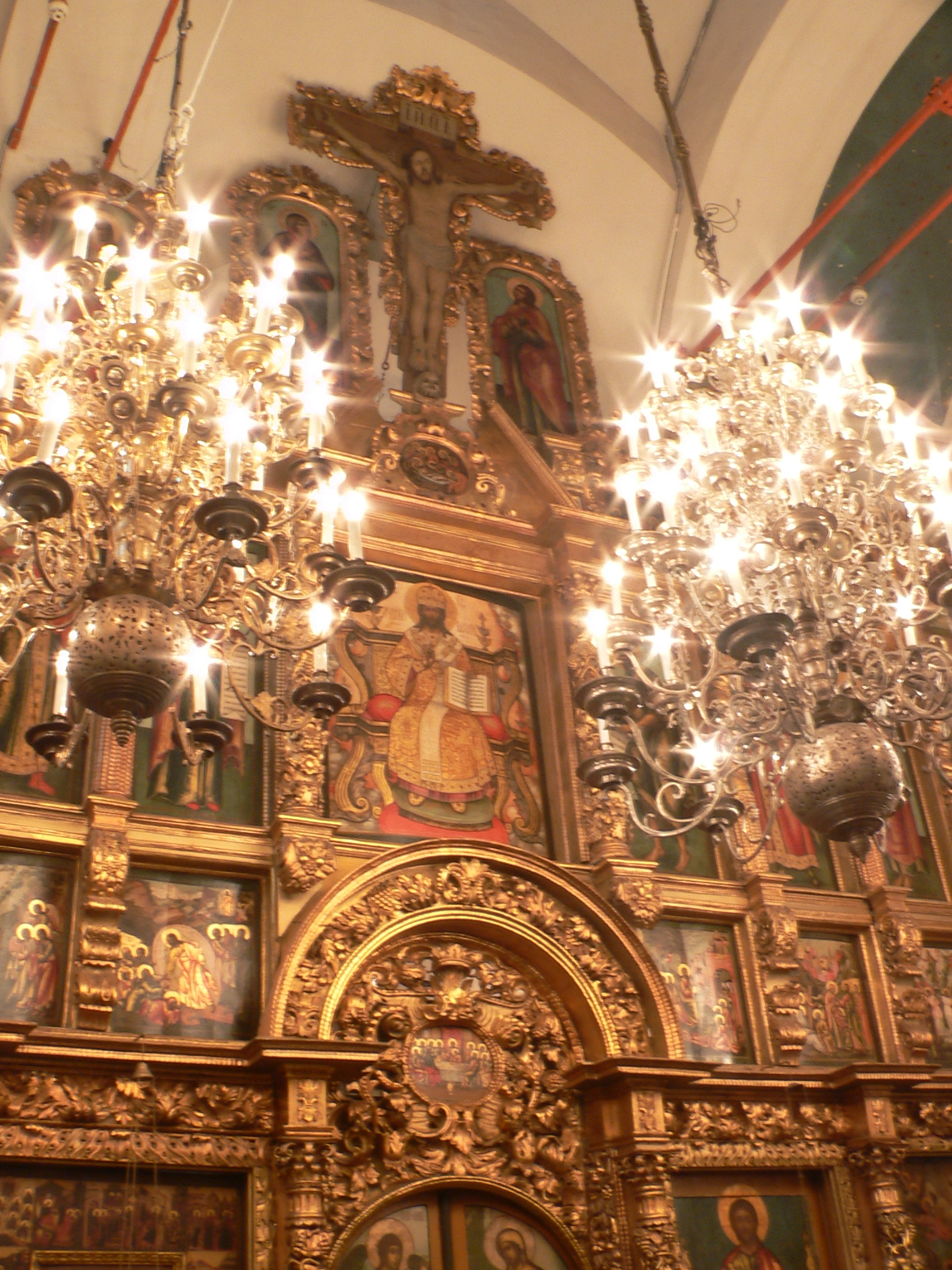
Crucifix on top of the iconostasis of Russian Orthodox Church of the Twelve Apostles in Moscow

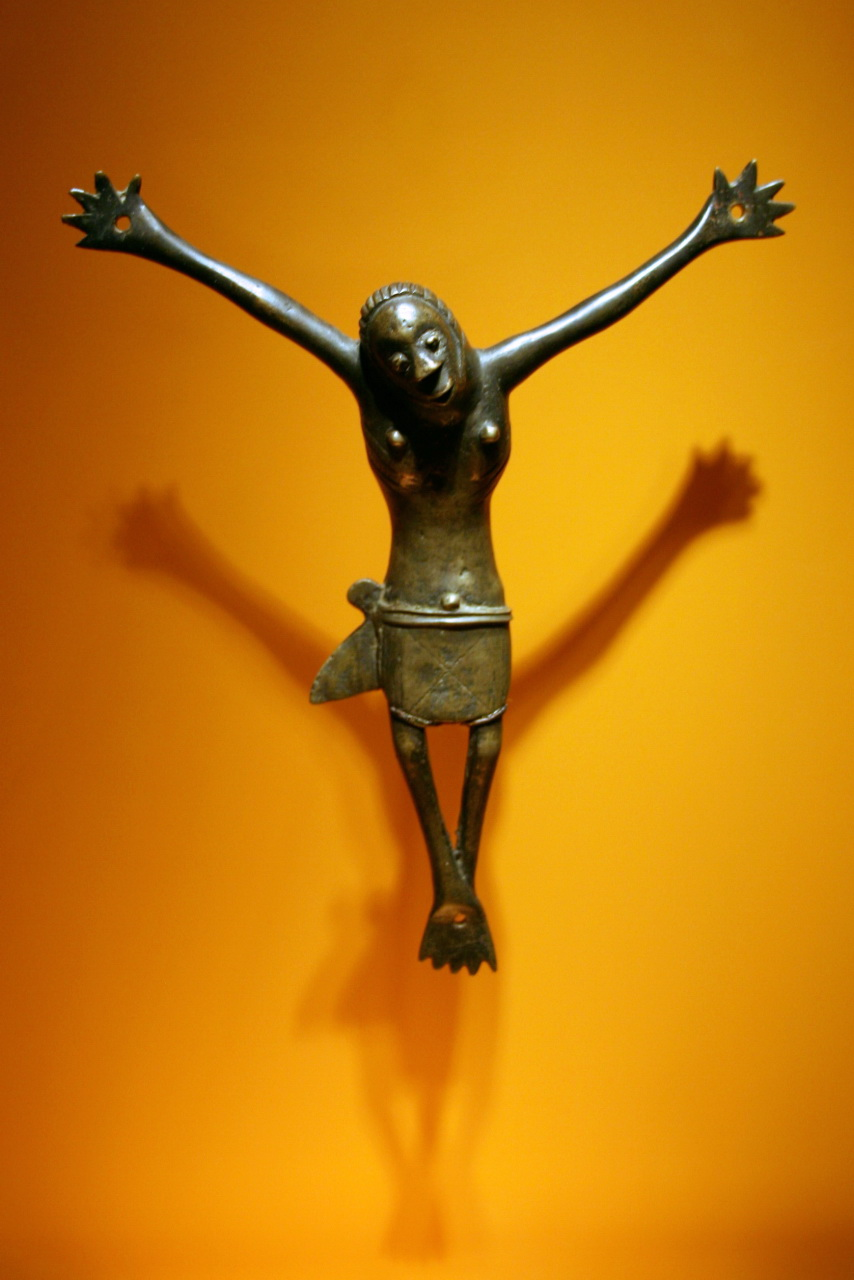
Seventeenth-century copper alloy crucifix, Democratic Republic of the Congo

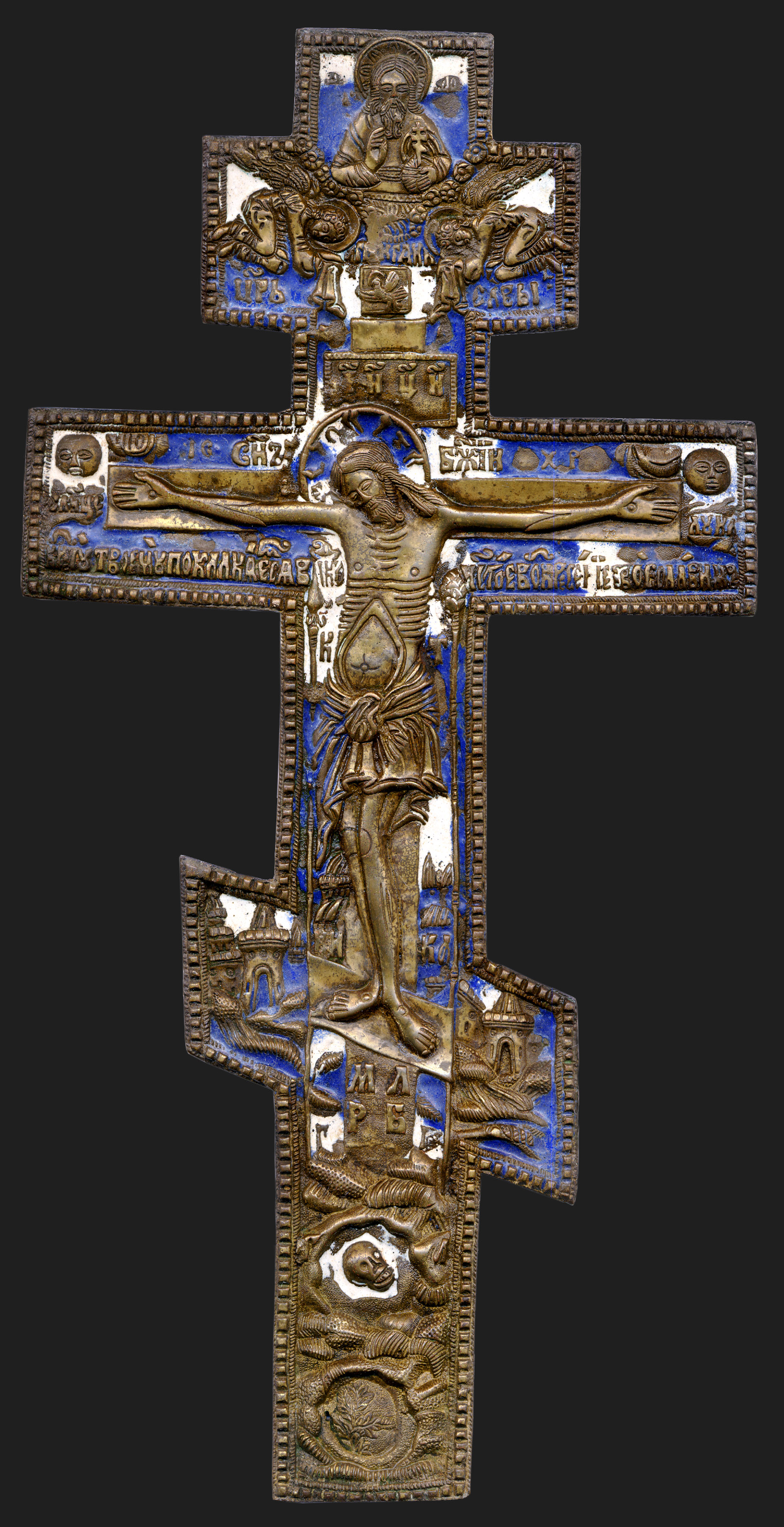
18th-century Russian Orthodox brass crucifix

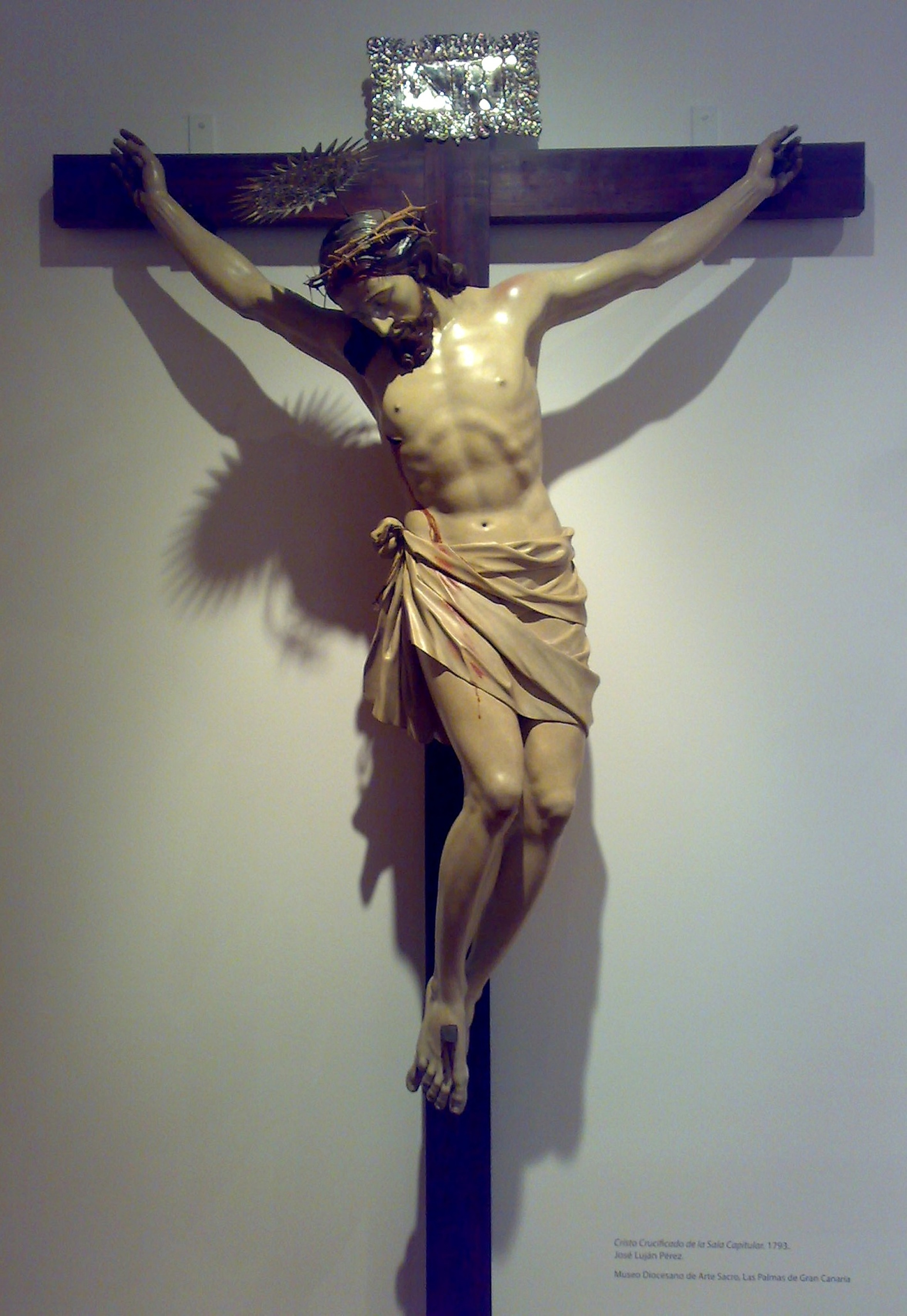
Crucified by José Luján Pérez, 1793, Cathedral of Santa Ana, Las Palmas de Gran Canaria

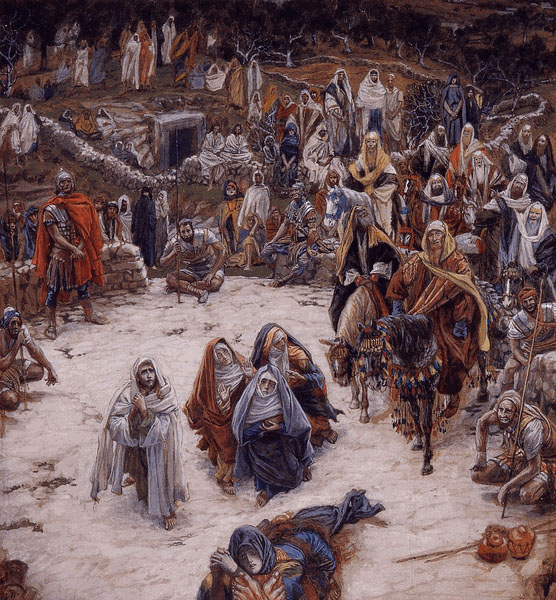
Crucifixion, seen from the Cross by the French painter James Tissot, 1886–1894, shows the view from the perspective of the crucified, and is regarded as an early example of the transition to modern art.

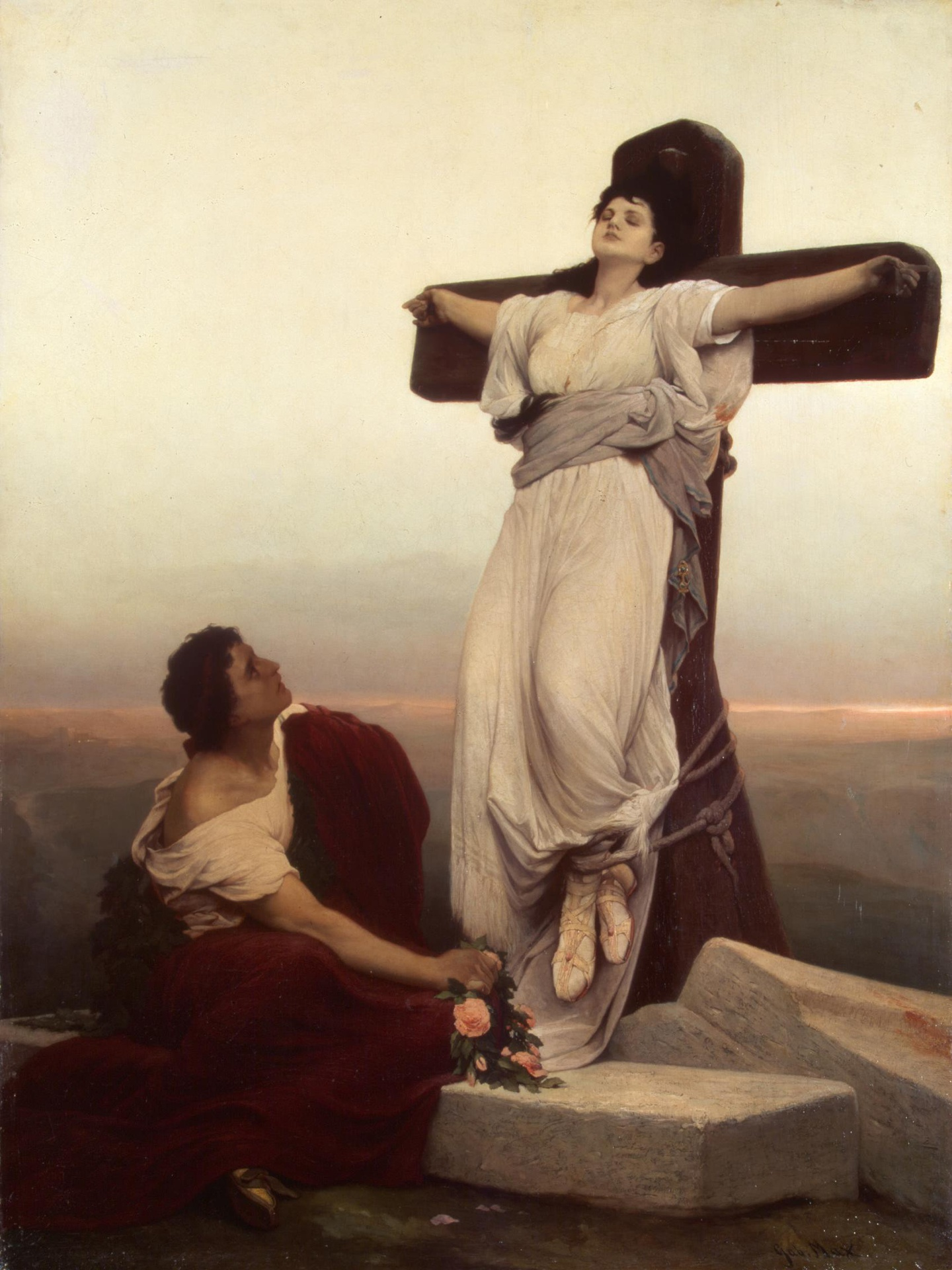
Gabriel von Max's 1866 painting Martyress depicts a crucified young woman and a young man laying flowers at her feet – a scene not corresponding to any of the female martyrs attested in formal Christian hagiography

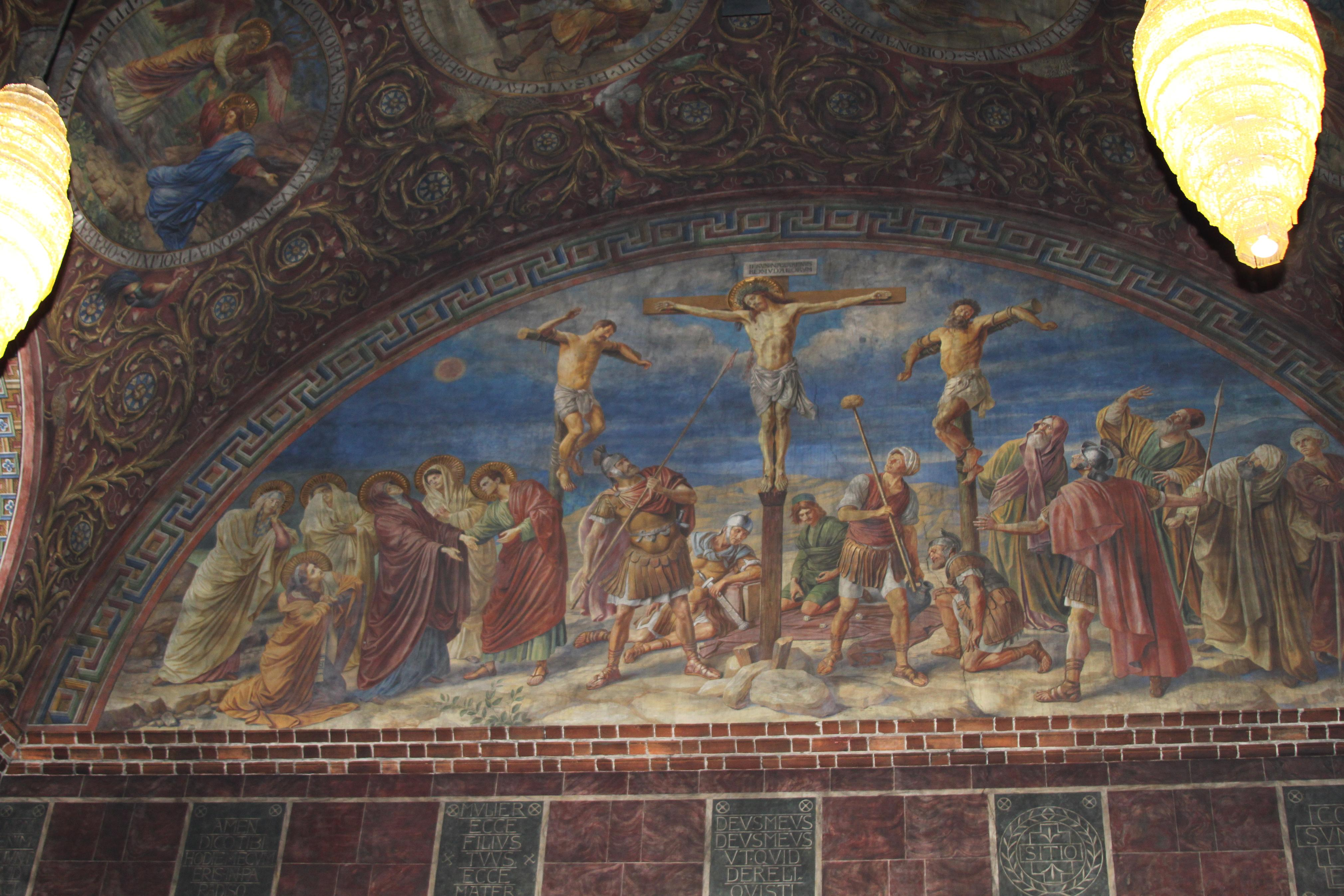
Mural of the Crucifixion in the Rosary Basilica (Berlin), 1906

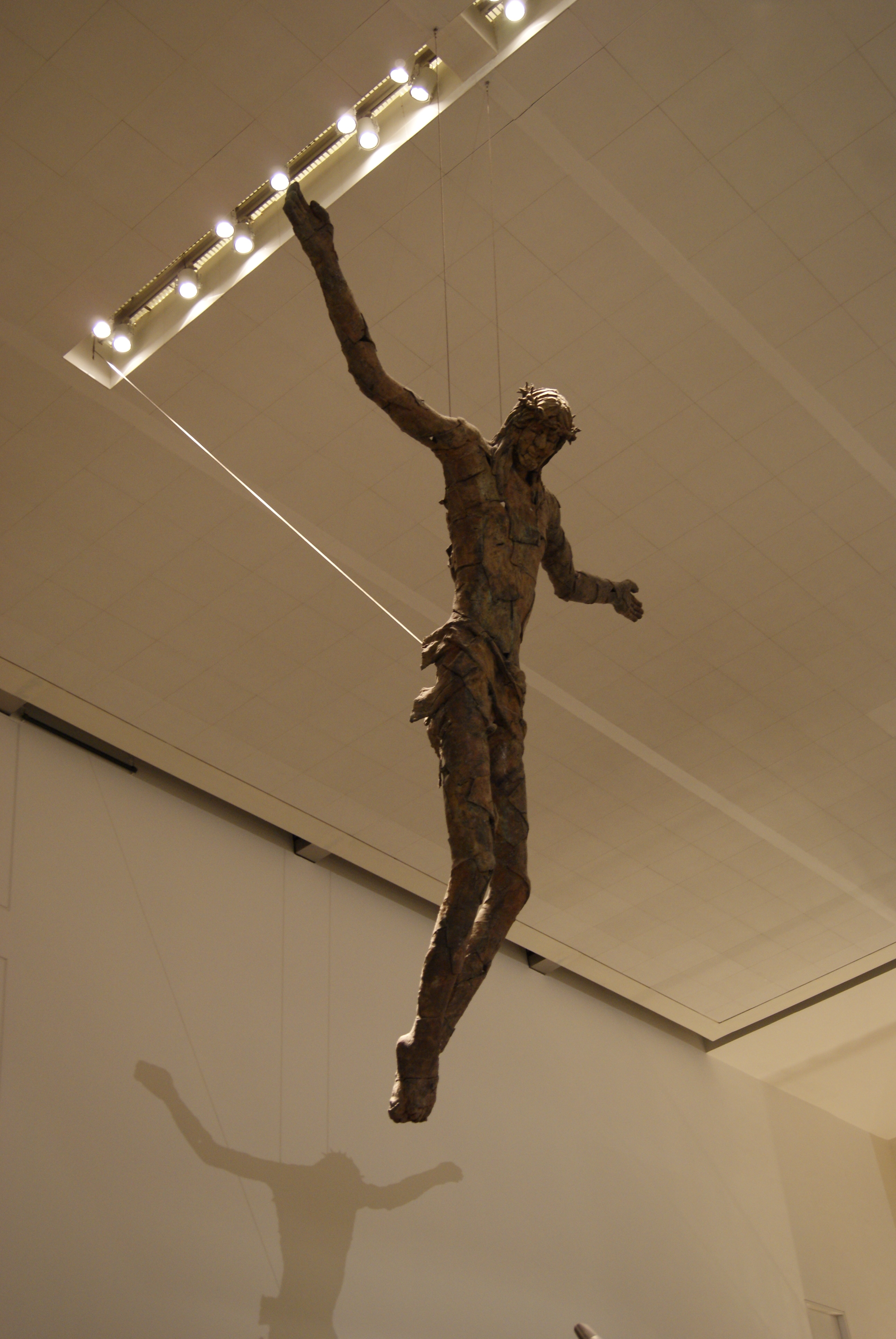
Crucifix at the Church of St Mary of the Angels, Singapore, 2004

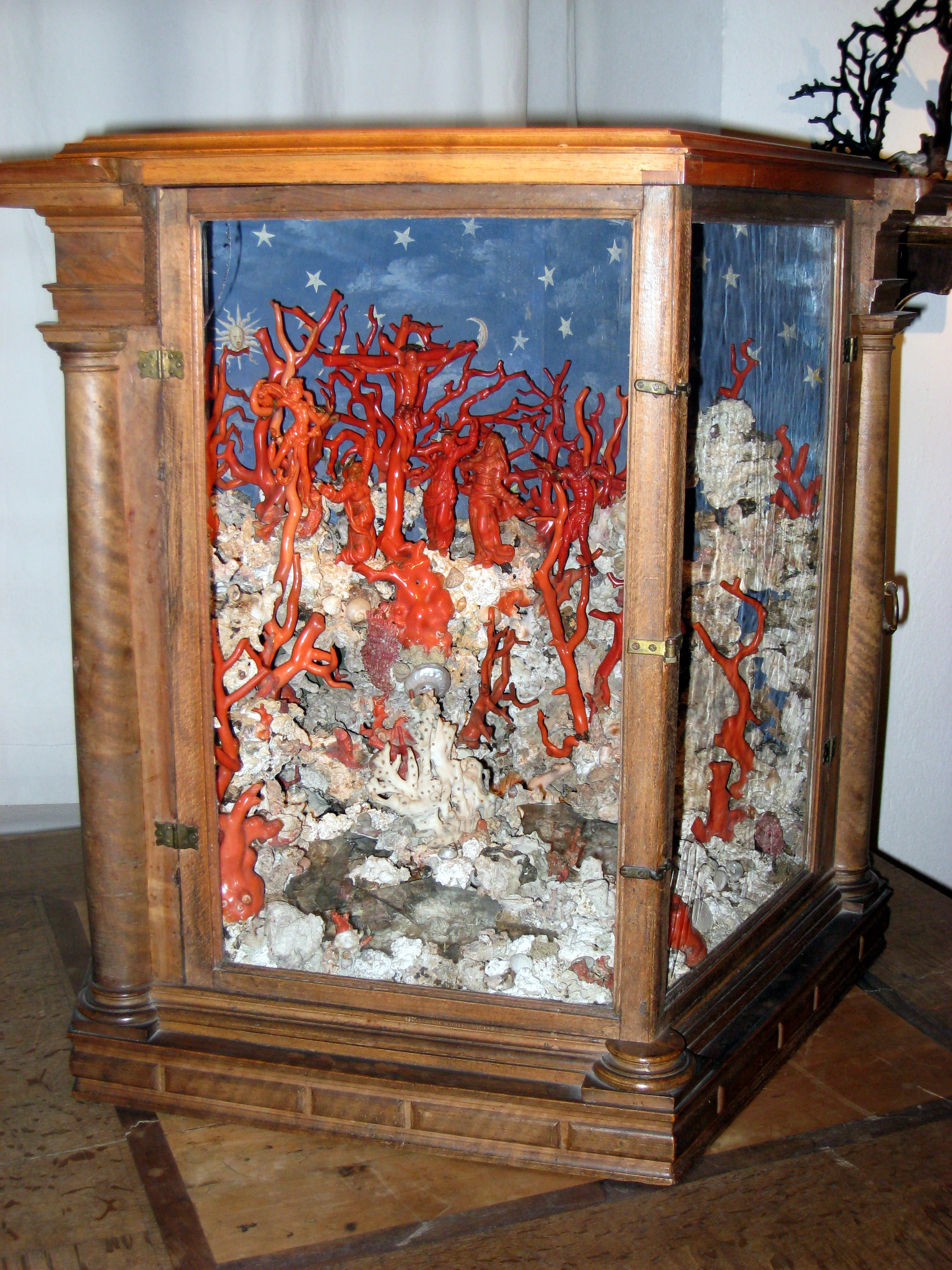
Crucifixes fashioned out of coral, Ambras Castle, Innsbruck, Austria, date uncertain

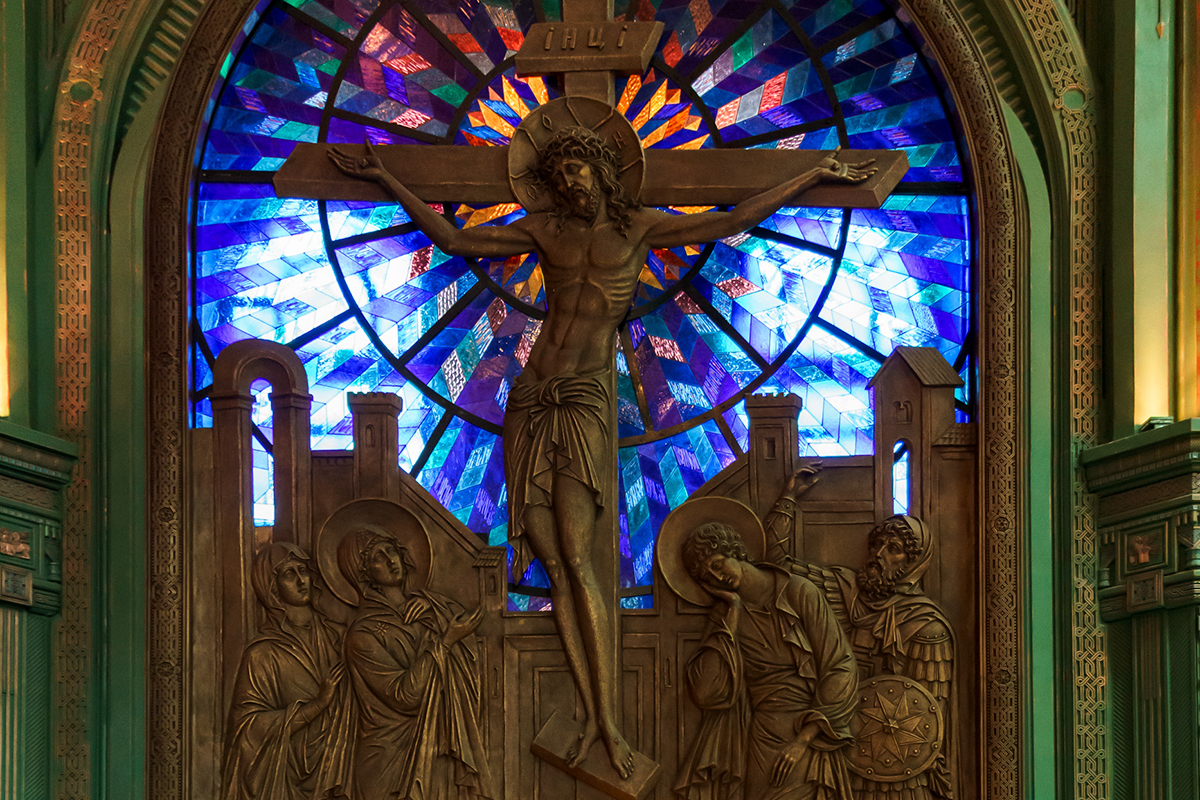
Crucifix at the Main Cathedral of the Russian Armed Forces, late 2010s

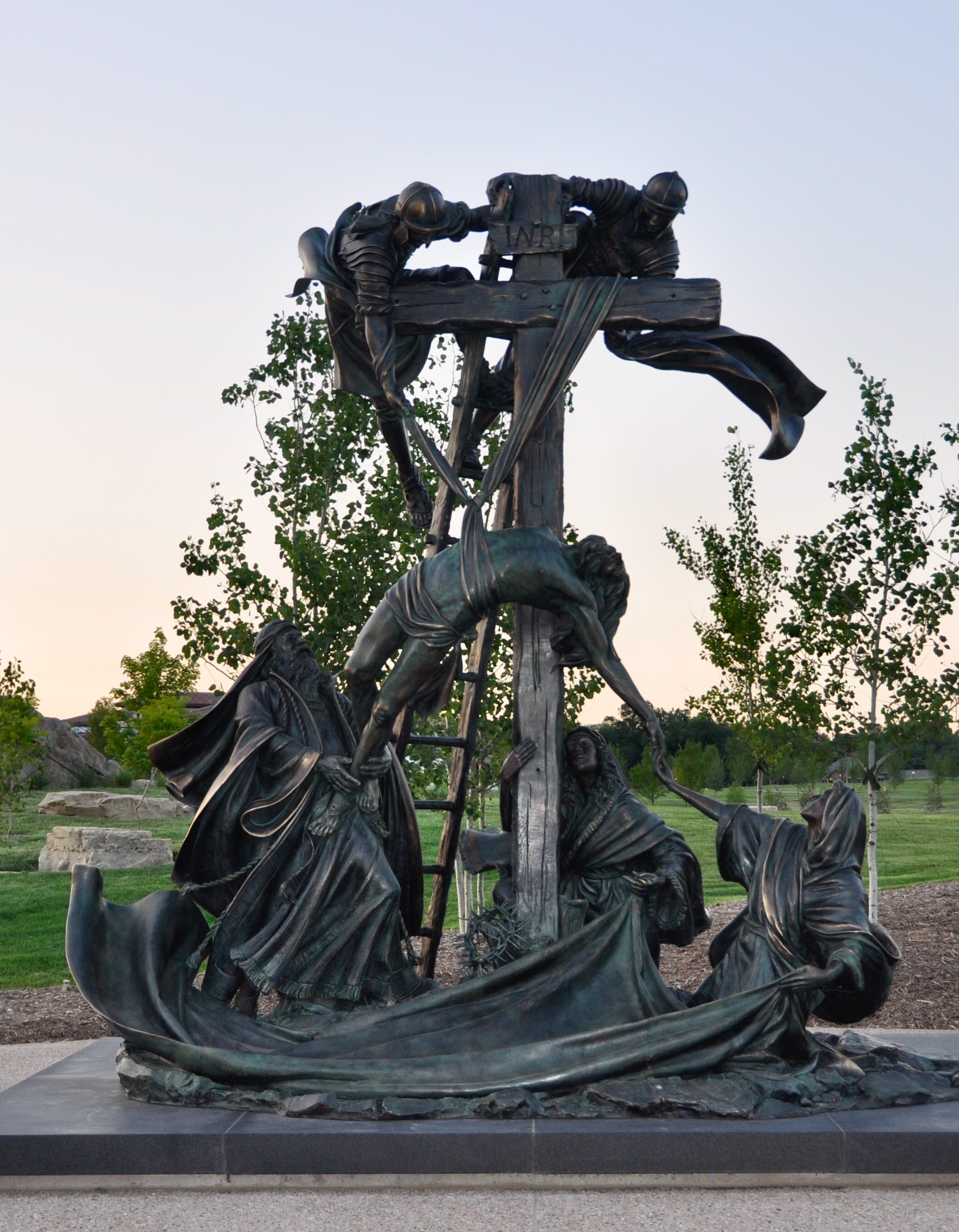
Stations of the Cross (station 13) sculpture by Lundeen Sculpture, 2018

=== Modern art ===
Crucifixion has appeared repeatedly as a theme in many forms of modern art.

The surrealist Salvador Dalí painted Crucifixion (Corpus Hypercubus), representing the cross as a hypercube. Fiona Macdonald describes the 1954 painting as showing a classical pose of Christ superimposed on a mathematical representation of the fourth dimension that is both unseeable and spiritual; Gary Bolyer assesses it as "one of the most beautiful works of the modern era." The sculpture Construction (Crucifixion): Homage to Mondrian, by Barbara Hepworth, stands on the grounds of Winchester Cathedral. Porfirio DiDonna's abstract Crucifixion is one of a number of religious works he painted in the 1960s, "blending the artist's devotion to the liturgy and his commitment to painting". The "Welsh Window", given to the 16th Street Baptist Church after it was bombed by four Ku Klux Klansmen in 1963, is a work of support and solidarity. The stained glass window depicts a black man, arms outstretched, reminiscent of the crucifixion of Jesus; it was sculpted by John Petts, who also initiated a campaign in Wales to raise money to help rebuild the church.

Photographer Robert Mapplethorpe's 1975 self-portrait shows the artist, nude and smiling, posed as if crucified. The 1983 painting Crucifixion, by Nabil Kanso, employs a perspective that places the viewer behind Christ's cross. In 1987 photographer Andres Serrano created Piss Christ, a controversial photograph that shows a small plastic crucifix submerged in a glass of the artist's urine, in which Serrano intended to depict sympathetically the abuse of Jesus by his executioners. In the 1990s, Marcus Reichert painted a series of crucifixions, though he did not identify the figure as Christ, but as a representation of human suffering.

Other artists have used crucifixion imagery as a form of protest. In 1974, Chris Burden had himself crucified to a Volkswagen in Trans-Fixed. Robert Cenedella painted a crucified Santa Claus as a protest against Christmas commercialization, displayed in the window of New York's Art Students League in December 1997. In August 2000, performance artist Sebastian Horsley had himself crucified without the use of any analgesics.

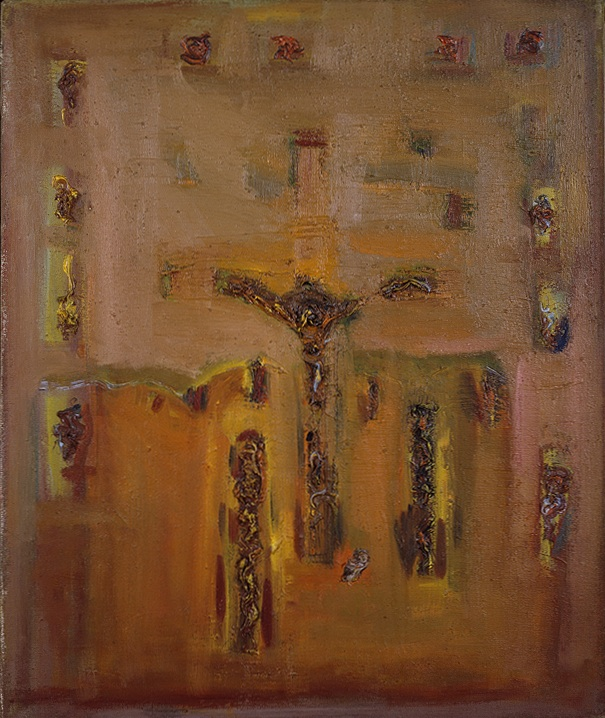
Crucifixion by Porfirio DiDonna, 1964, oil on linen, 24 x 20 inches

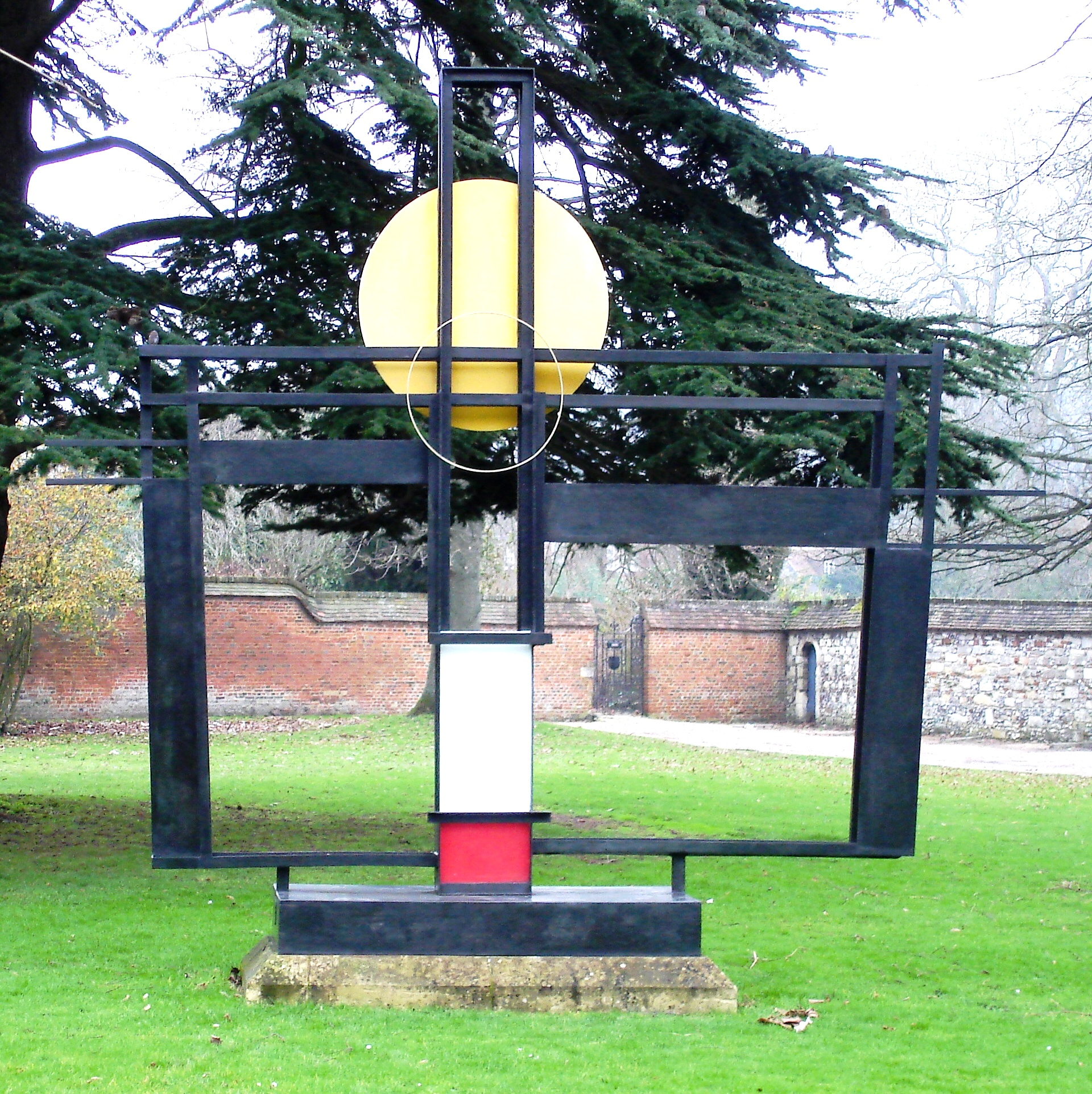
Construction (Crucifixion): Homage to Mondrian, 1966, by Barbara Hepworth

Chris Burden's 1974 performance piece Trans-Fixed, in which he is crucified on a Volkswagen

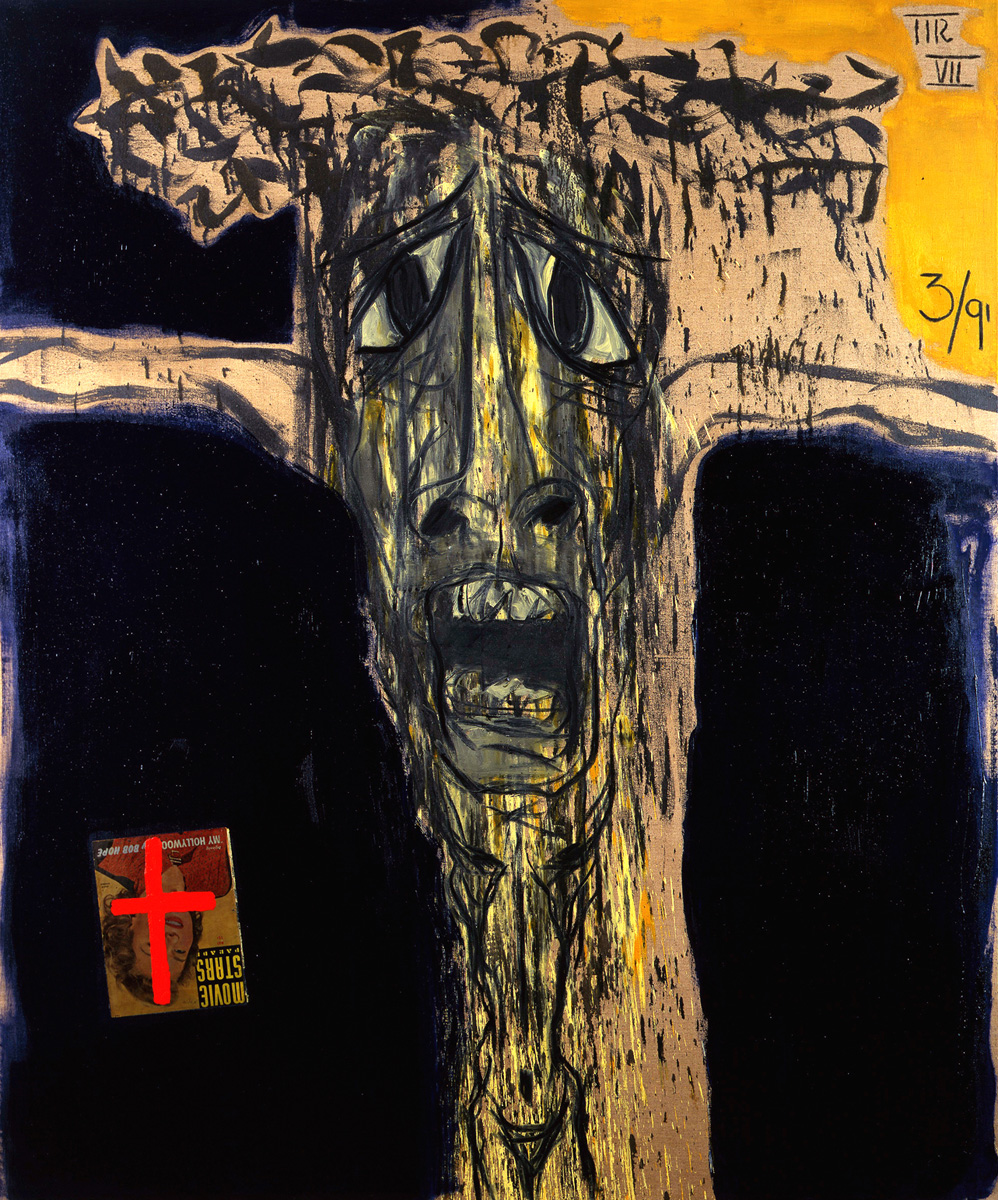
Marcus Reichert, Crucifixion VII (1991), oil and charcoal on linen with newsprint collage, 74" x 62"

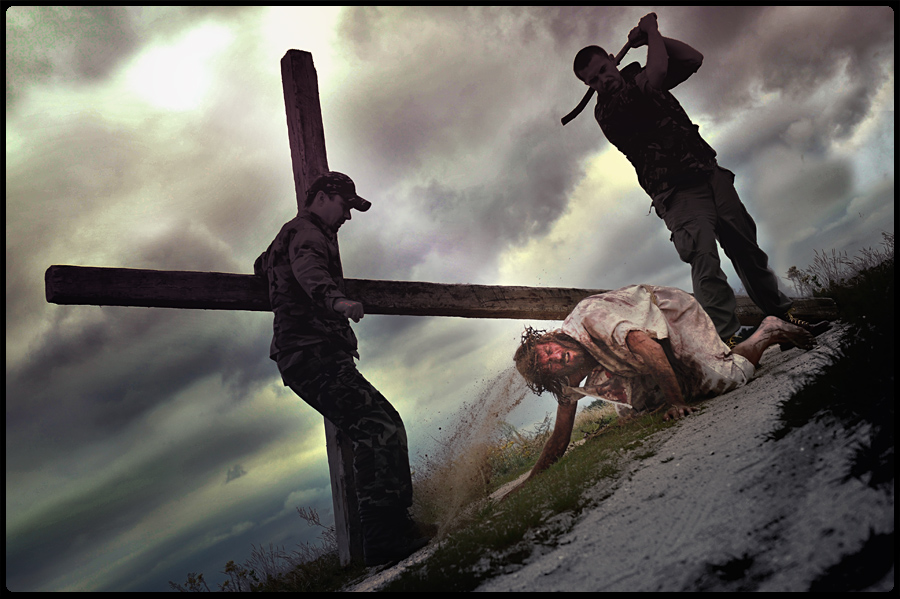
Jesus Falls the Third Time, a photographic performance by Łukasz Jankowski-Wojtczak, 2011

=== Popular art ===
Crucifixion in popular art, as with modern art, is sometimes used for its shock value. For example, a World War I Liberty bond poster by Fernando Amorsolo depicts a German soldier nailing an American soldier, his arms outspread, to the trunk of a tree. Crucifixion imagery is also used to make points in political cartoons. An image of a skinhead being crucified is a popular symbol among the skinhead subculture, and it is used to convey a sense of societal alienation or persecution against the subculture.

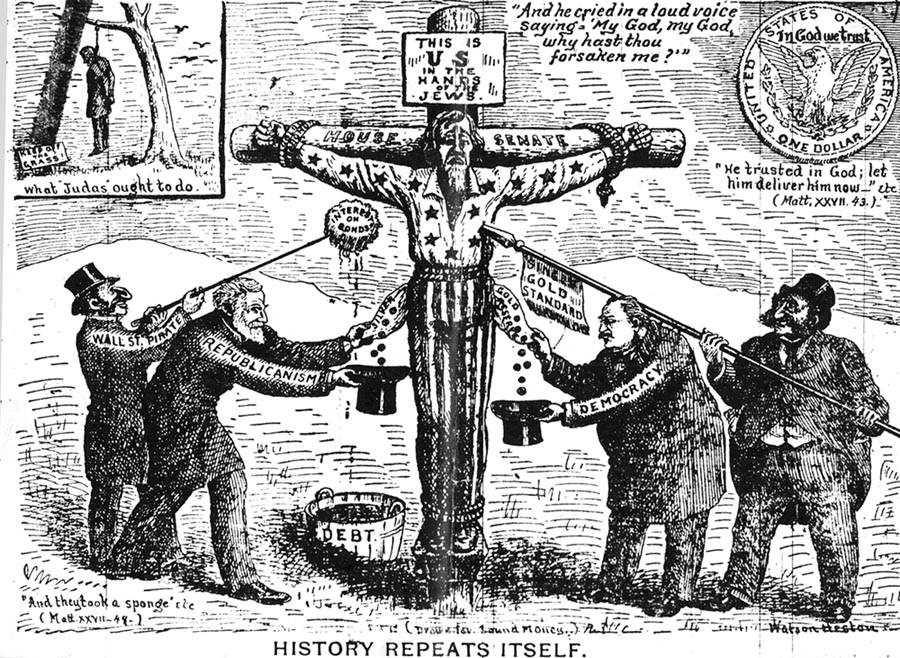
Antisemitic American political cartoon, 1896

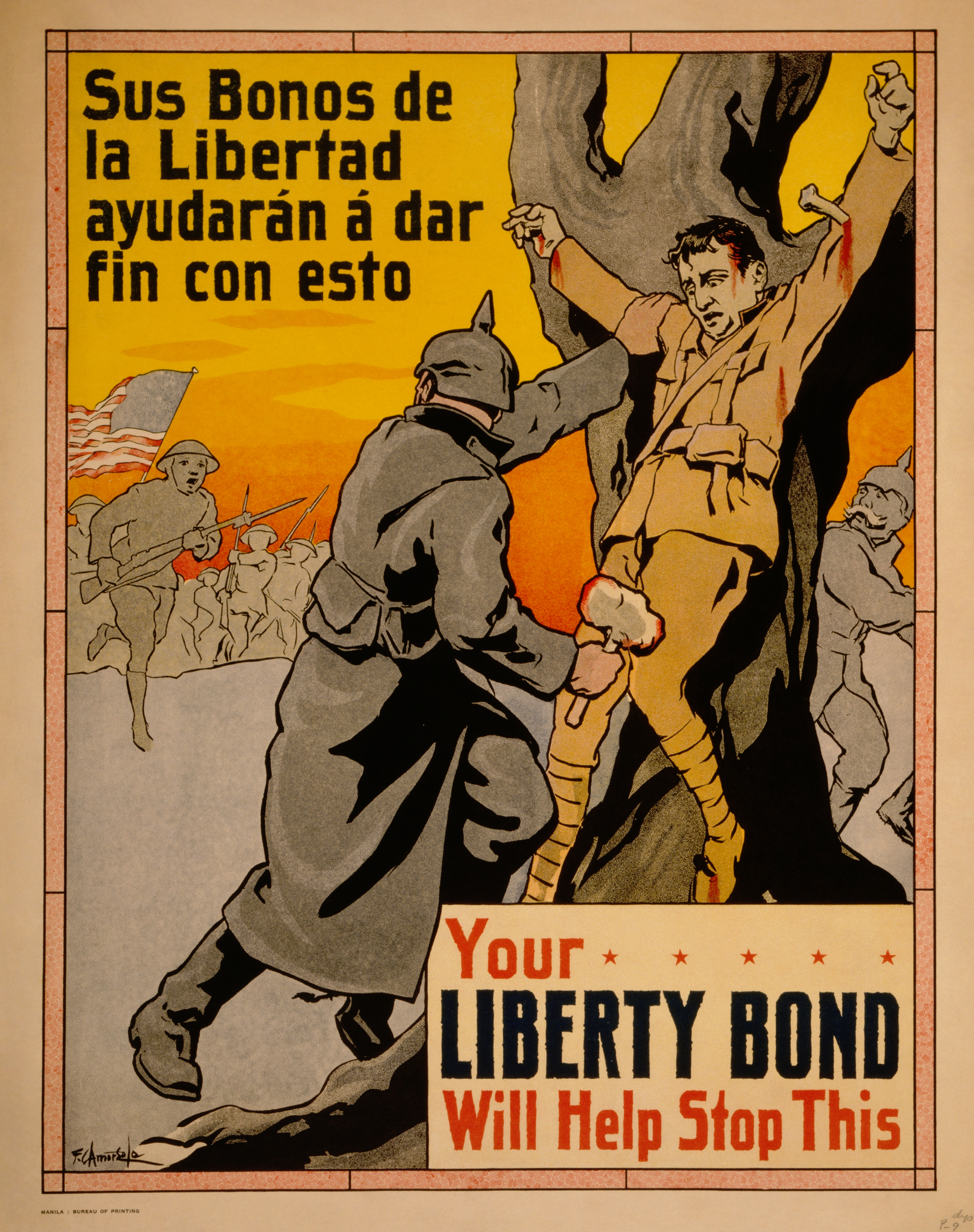
Liberty Bond poster by Fernando Amorsolo

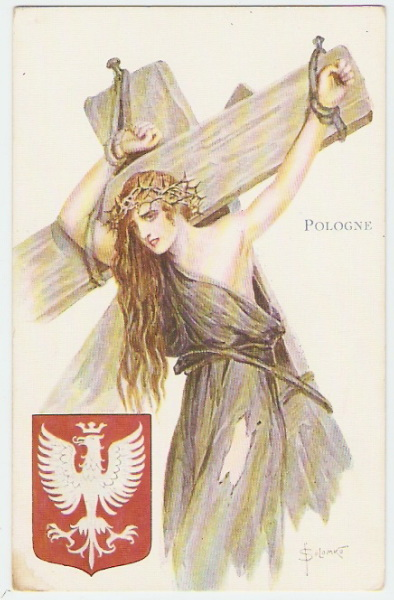
Postcard protesting German occupation of Poland. Sergey Solomko, circa 1915–17

A crucified skinhead, an identifying symbol of the skinhead subculture

== Print media ==
=== Novels ===
Sue Monk Kidd's 2020 novel The Book of Longings, tells the fictional story of Ana, an educated woman who marries Jesus. D. G. Martin says the novel "reconstructs the crucifixion experience in a way more horrible and poignant than any of the four Gospels."

=== Graphic novels ===
In the conclusion of Animal Man #5's The Coyote Gospel, "Crafty Coyote" dies in a cruciform pose, on a crossroads.

Crucifixion figures prominently in graphic novels from many cultures throughout the world. In Western comic books, characters in cruciform are seen more often than actual crucifixions. For example, Animal Man's fifth issue earned an Eisner Award nomination in 1989 for its "The Coyote Gospel", the story of Crafty, a thinly-disguised Wile E. Coyote (of the Road Runner cartoons) and the depiction at the culmination of the issue of his dead body in cruciform. Superman, often seen as a Christ figure, has also been crucified, as well as being shown in cruciform.

Comparison of images from the manga Fullmetal Alchemist by Hiromu Arakawa, showing crucifixion in the original Japanese version (left), and alteration of the image for distribution in the United States (right)

Crucifixions and crucifixes have appeared repeatedly in Japanese manga and anime. In manga iconography, crucifixes serve two purposes: as death symbols, and as symbols of justice. Scholars such as Michael Broderick and Susan J. Napier argue that Japanese readers associate crucifixion imagery with apocalyptic themes, and trace this symbolism to Japanese secular views of the bombings of Hiroshima and Nagasaki, rather than to religious faith. Producers of anime generally deny any religious motivation for depiction of crucifixion. Concern that Westerners may find these portrayals of crucifixion offensive has led some distributors and localization studios to remove crucifixion imagery from manga such as Fullmetal Alchemist and anime such as Sailor Moon.

== Music ==
=== Classical music ===
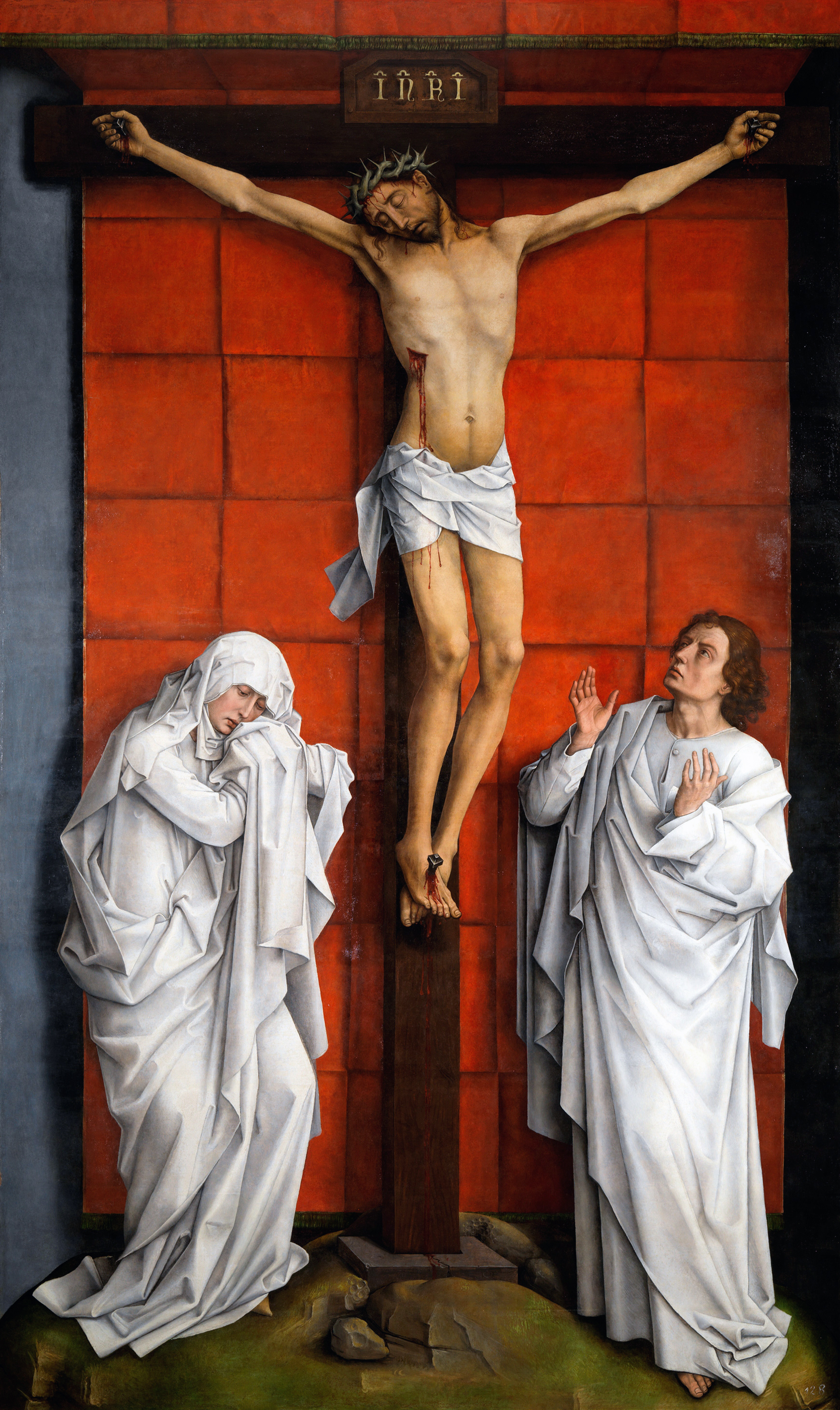
In music, Stabat Mater refers to compositions of a hymn of the same name, while Stabat Mater in art is a specific form of depiction, as in this painting by Rogier van der Weyden, circa 1460.

Famous depictions of crucifixion in classical music include the St John Passion and St Matthew Passion by Johann Sebastian Bach, and Giovanni Battista Pergolesi's setting of Stabat Mater. Notable recent settings include the St. Luke Passion (1965) by Polish composer Krzysztof Penderecki and the St. John Passion (1982) by Estonian composer Arvo Pärt. The 2000 work, La Pasión según San Marcos (St. Mark Passion) by Argentinian Jewish composer Osvaldo Golijov, was named one of the top classical compositions of the decade for its fusion of traditional passion motifs with Afro-Cuban, tango, Capoeira, and Kaddish themes.

Crucifixion has figured prominently in Easter cantatas, oratorios, and requiems. The third section of a full mass, the Credo, contains the following passage at its climax: "Crucifixus etiam pro nobis sub Pontio Pilato, passus et sepultus est," which means "And was crucified also for us under Pontius Pilate; he suffered and was buried." This passage was sometimes set to music separately as a Crucifixus, the most famous example being that of Antonio Lotti for eight voices.

The seven utterances of Jesus while on the Cross, gathered from the four gospels, have inspired many musical compositions, from Heinrich Schütz in 1645 to Ruth Zechlin in 1996, with the best known being Joseph Haydn's composition, written in 1787.

Depictions of crucifixion outside the Christian context are rare. One of the few examples is in Ernest Reyer's opera Salammbô (1890).

=== Popular music ===
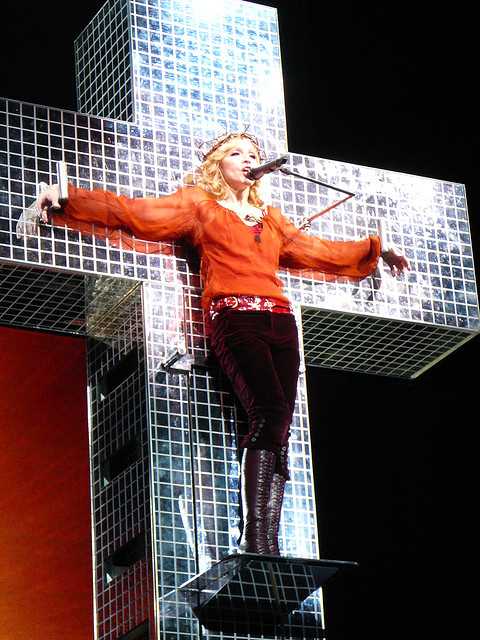
Madonna in 2006 simulating a crucifixion onstage

The 1970 rock opera Jesus Christ Superstar by Tim Rice and Andrew Lloyd Webber ends with Jesus' crucifixion.

The cover art of Tupac Shakur's album The Don Killuminati: The 7 Day Theory features an image of Shakur being crucified. The artist who created the image, Ronald Brent, stated that the idea for the image was Shakur's, and that the "crucifixion was supposed to be a statement about race and what it felt like to be young, rich and black in America." Marilyn Manson often utilises crucifixion imagery, oddly staged in surreal modern or near modern-day settings. The Norwegian black metal band Gorgoroth had several people on stage affixed to crosses to give the appearance of crucifixion at a now infamous concert in Kraków, and repeated this act in the music video for "Carving a Giant." In 2006, singer Madonna opened a provocative concert held near Vatican City with an onstage crucifixion, complete with a crown of thorns, which was also labeled as a move to bring attention to the issue of African children dying of AIDS.

== Passion plays ==
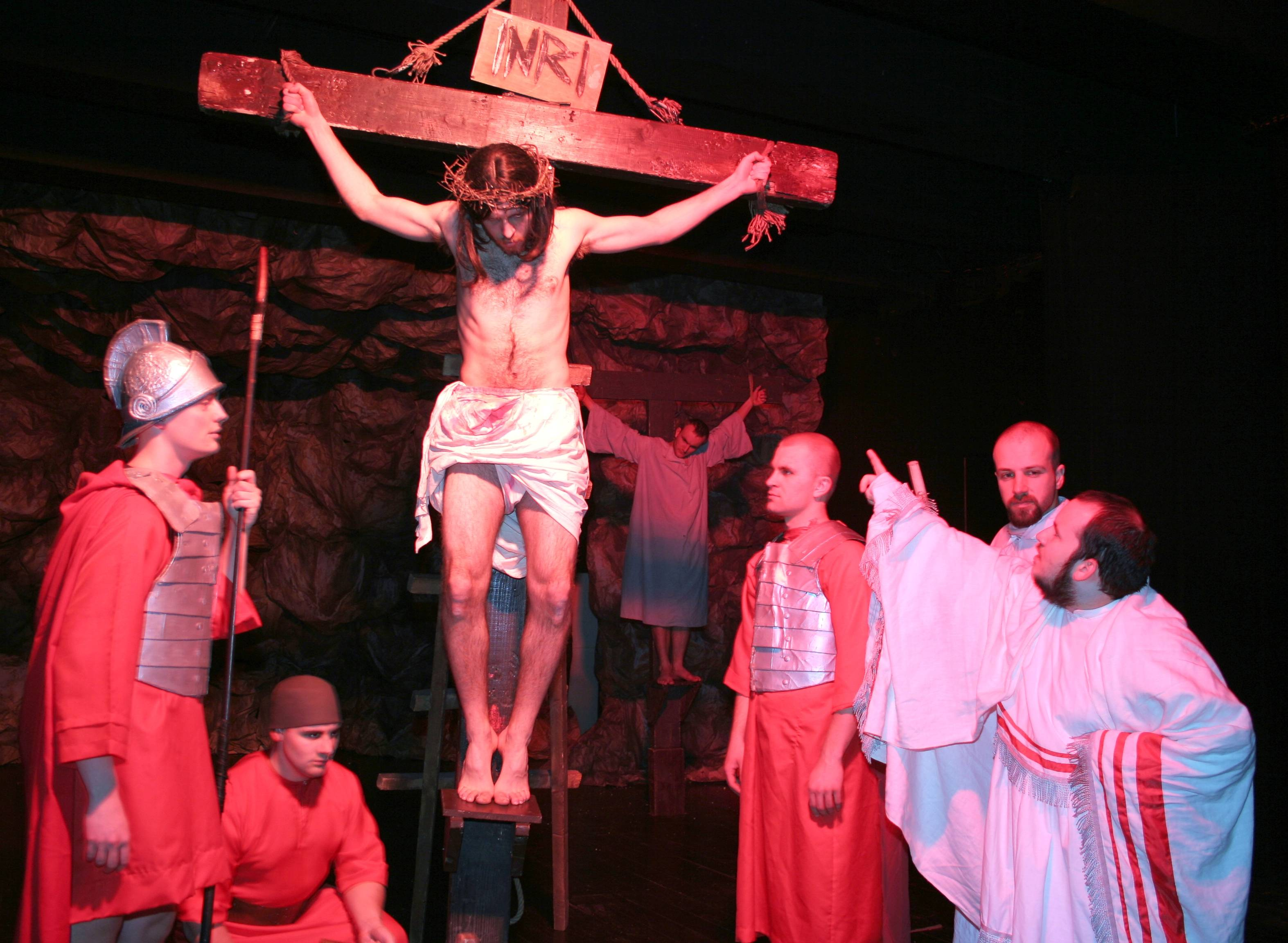
A passion play, Poland, 2006

Passion plays are dramatic presentations of the trial and crucifixion of Jesus. They originated as expressions of devotion in the Middle Ages. In modern times, critics have said that some performances are antisemitic, portraying Jews as Jesus's murderous and hateful antagonists.

== Film and television ==
=== Film ===
Numerous movies have been produced which depict the crucifixion of Jesus. Some of these movies depict the crucifixion in its traditional sectarian form, while others intend to show a more historically accurate account. For example, Ben-Hur (1959), was probably the first movie to depict the nails being driven through Jesus' wrists, rather than his palms. Mel Gibson's controversial The Passion of the Christ (2004) depicted an extreme level of violence, but showed the nails being driven into Jesus' palms, as is traditional, with ropes supporting the wrists.

Although crucifixion imagery is common, few films depict actual crucifixion outside of a Christian context. Spartacus (1960) depicts the mass crucifixions of rebellious slaves along the Appian Way after the Third Servile War. Conan the Barbarian (1982) depicts the protagonist being crucified on the Tree of Woe.

The 1979 British comedy film Monty Python's Life of Brian ends with a comical sequence in which several of the cast, including Brian, are crucified by the Romans. The film ends with them all singing the song "Always Look on the Bright Side of Life". In this sequence, the characters are not nailed to the crosses, but tied at the wrists to the crossbar, and are standing on smaller crosspieces at foot level.

=== Television ===
The HBO television series Rome (2005–2007) contained several depictions of crucifixion, as it was a common torture method during the historical period the show takes place in. In contrast, the crucifixion of the character Æthelstan in the History Channel series Vikings is historically inaccurate, in that it shows him being crucified by fellow Christians.

Some television performers have used crucifixion to make a point. The Australian comedian John Safran had himself crucified in the Philippines as part of a Good Friday crucifixion ritual for the Australian Broadcasting Corporation show, John Safran's Race Relations (2009). Singer Robbie Williams performed a stunt on an April 2006 Easter Sunday show shown on the UK television channel Channel 4, in which he was affixed to a cross and pierced with needles.

Crucifixion has been depicted in the television series Xena: Warrior Princess (1995–2001), where its depiction has been cited in feminist studies as illustrating violent and misogynist tendencies.

The spiritually-themed Japanese anime series Neon Genesis Evangelion features crucifixion as a recurring motif, similarly to anime graphic novels. There are cross-shaped explosions, and the character Lilith is portrayed as crucified. According to Aaron Meehan, these images appear more than fifteen times, and are typically associated with the appearance of angels, and the crosses are characteristically colored red. Meehan interprets these features as unrelated to Christian iconography, and instead sees the imagery primarily as symbolizing death and danger. He also notes that co-creator Kazuya Tsurumaki has stated that he did not intend such imagery to be specifically Christian, nor to offend Westerners, and that the images were designed to be "mysterious".

== Sports ==
The Christ Air trick invented by skateboarder and later evangelical pastor Christian Hosoi was so named due to its intended resemblance to Jesus Christ's cruciform pose on the cross.

== See also ==
- Crucifixion (disambiguation)
- Christian cross
- Christian symbolism
- Depiction of Jesus
- Descent from the Cross
- Stations of the Cross
- Religious images in Christian theology
