= Crucifixion (Nabil Kanso) =

1983 painting by Nabil Kanso

- Year: 1983

The Crucifixion is the subject of a painting by Nabil Kanso painted in 1983.

== Description ==
It is oil on canvas measuring 2.75 X 2.25 meters (9 X 7 feet).

The color conception is dark brown, near black with flashes of red hues in a composition reflecting what some critical opinion point out "The unique perspective of this Crucifixion sets us behind Christ's Cross witnessing, along with many other hollow faces, an indistinct Jesus set off from the chaotic background by a searing white aura."

== See also ==
- Crucifixion in the arts
