= Porfirio DiDonna =

American artist

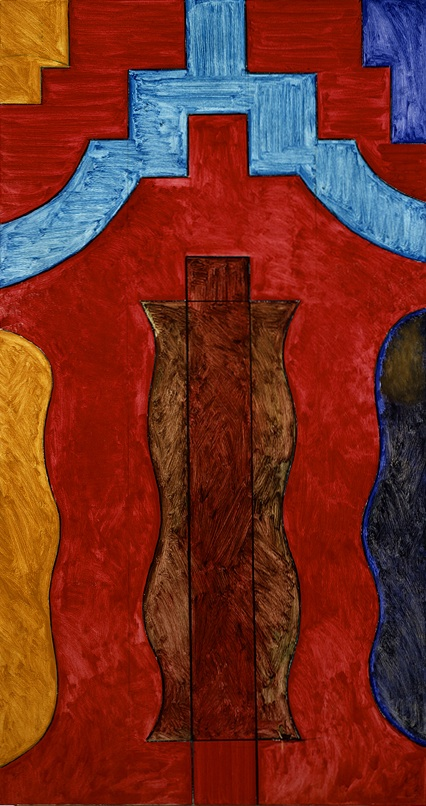
Porfirio DiDonna, Untitled PDN 4, 1985, oil on linen, 84 x 43 inches.

Porfirio DiDonna (1942–1986) was a 20th century American artist based in New York City.

== Life ==
Porfirio DiDonna was born on April 11th, 1942 in Red Hook, Brooklyn. the son of Frank and Mary DiDonna. He had an older brother and sister, Salvatore and Joanne, and a younger sister, Catherine. He died in Brooklyn on 26 August 1986 at the age of 44.

== Work ==
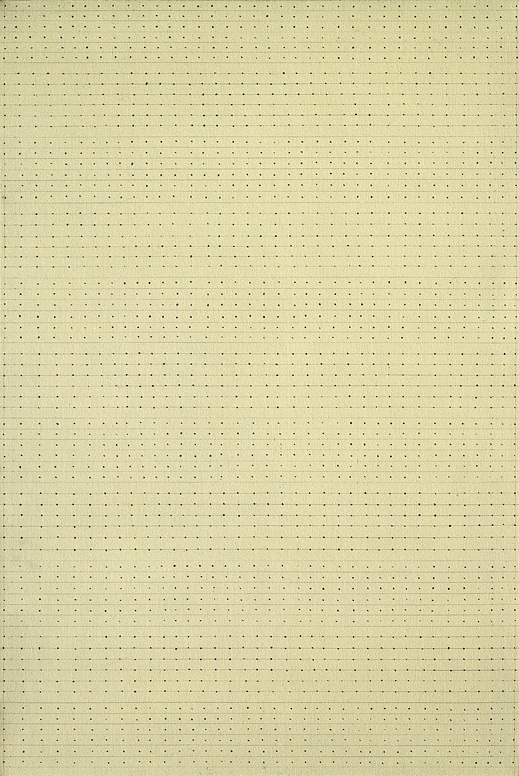
Porfirio DiDonna, Untitled PDN 152, 1972, acrylic and graphite on canvas, 36 x 24 ¼ inches.

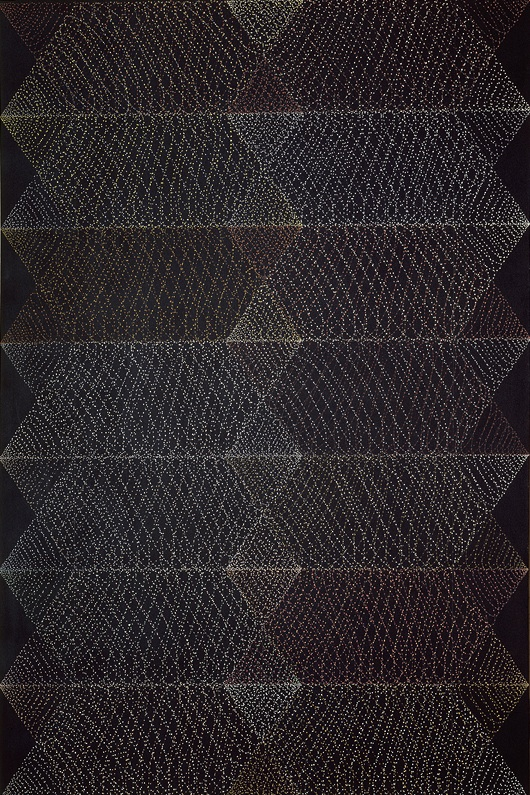
Porfirio DiDonna Untitled PDN 82 1971, acrylic and graphite on canvas, 106 x 70 inches.

DiDonna went to Alexander Hamilton Technical High School in Brooklyn and attended Brooklyn College for one semester. In 1961 he enrolled in the Pratt Institute, also in Brooklyn, and graduated in 1964. From 1966 to 1968 he pursued his graduate degree in fine arts at Columbia University.

Among his early influences were Matisse, Mondrain, and Kandinsky, as well as Raphael and early Italian Renaissance artists such as Fra Angelico. He called his early paintings “religious” and they often were on religious themes, such as crucifixions and the stations of the cross.

By 1970 he was starting to work with the minimal marks that would come to characterize his painting and in late 1971 he “chose to limit himself to only dots, dashes, or straight lines loosely aligned in a horizontal and vertical formation. The restrictions resulted in a flexible grid, a form that would wholly absorb him for nearly a decade.”

The critic, Barry Schwabsky, in an essay for a 1994 exhibition catalog wrote that reviewers of DiDonna's work in the 1970s naturally mentioned Agnes Martin as an influence, as well as Brice Marden and the early dot paintings of Larry Poons.

He made a trip to Italy in 1980 and to Mexico in 1981 where he admired the Mayan and Aztec sites. By this time DiDonna had moved away from linear grids of lines and dots and began to experiment with “asymmetry and welcomed unexpected light.” An hour-glass shape started to become an important structural element in his paintings.

DiDonna’s work is in numerous public collections and in 2013 a major retrospective was exhibited at the Danforth Museum in Framingham, Massachusetts.

== Public collections ==
- Jewett Arts Center, Wellesley College, Wellesley, Massachusetts
- Museum of Contemporary Art, Chicago, Illinois
- Museum of Fine Arts, Boston, Massachusetts
- Museum of Fine Arts, Houston, Texas
- Minnesota Museum of American Art, Saint Paul, Minnesota
- The Phillips Collection, Washington, D.C.
- Portland Art Museum, Portland, Oregon
- Rose Art Museum, Brandeis University, Waltham, Massachusetts
- Berkeley Art Museum, Berkeley, California
- Albany Museum of Art], Albany, Georgia
