= Petros Lambardos =

Greek painter (1500–1550)

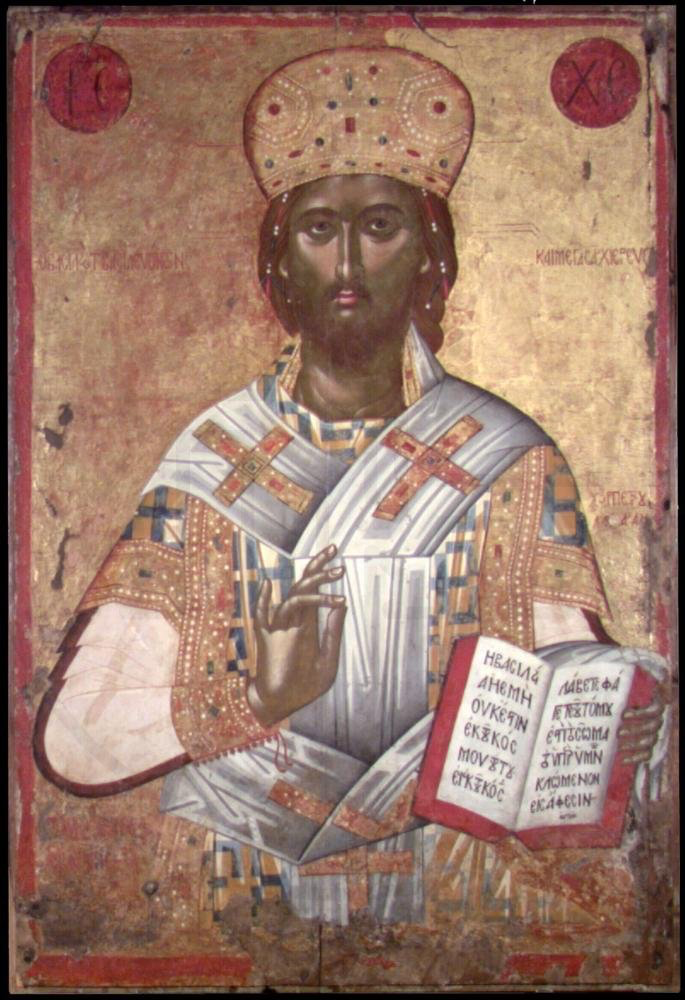
- Christ High Priest
- Born: Early 16th Century; Heraklion, Republic of Venice
- Died: Middle of the 16th Century; Heraklion, Republic of Venice
- Known for: Iconography

Petros Lambardos (Greek: Πέτρος Λαμπάρδος, 1500 – 1550), also known as Petro Lambardou (Greek: Πέτρου Λαμπάρδου), or Petrus Lambardo, was a Greek Renaissance painter from Crete. One of the earliest recorded members of the Lambardos family of painters. He comes from a famous family of painters from the island of Crete. Similar to the Bathas, Moskos, and Tzanes family. The family had many notable painters. Emmanuel Lambardos has the largest catalog of works. Two other notable painters of the same last name were Ioannis and Tzortzi Lambardos. The family were major contributors to the Cretan painting style. Three of Petros's paintings survived. The Virgin Mary painting is in Cyprus, Christ the High Priest is at the Benaki Museum and John the Baptist is in Palermo, Italy.

== History ==
Petros was born in Heraklion in the early part of the 16th century. He is one of the first documented painters of the famous Lambardos family. Most of the family were painters, the Institute for Neohellenic Research has records of eleven members of the family from 1500 to 1800.

Six of the painters have existing works, two of them were named Emmanuel Lambardos, another two were named Joachim. The final two were Ioannis and Tzortzi Lambardos. They were one of the most prominent families of the Cretan School and influenced the art movement.

Elias Moskos also shared the same last name as Leos Moskos and Ioannis Moskos. Another important family in Crete were the relatives of Andreas Ritzos his son was Nikolaos Ritzos. Many members of the Ritzos family were painters.

Petros was mentioned in a notary document on July 11, 1531. He was a witness in some other government documents between 1529 and 1534. He was mentioned as ser Petrus Lambardo. The signature on two of his icons is χειρ Πέτρου Λαμ(π)άρδου.

== Bibliography ==
- Hatzidakis, Manolis (1987). Greek painters after the fall (1450-1830) Volume A. Athens, GR: Center for Modern Greek Studies E.I.E.
- Hatzidakis, Manolis & Drakopoulou, Eugenia (1997). Greek painters after the fall (1450-1830) Volume B. Athens, GR: Center for Modern Greek Studies E.I.E.
- Drakopoulou, Eugenia (2010). Greek painters after the fall (1450-1830) Volume C. Athens, GR: Center for Modern Greek Studies E.I.E.
