= Virgin and Child on Bronze (Moskos) =

Painting by Elias Moskos

- Η Παναγία Βρεφοκρατούσα (Greek), La Madonna col Bambino su Bronzo (Italian)
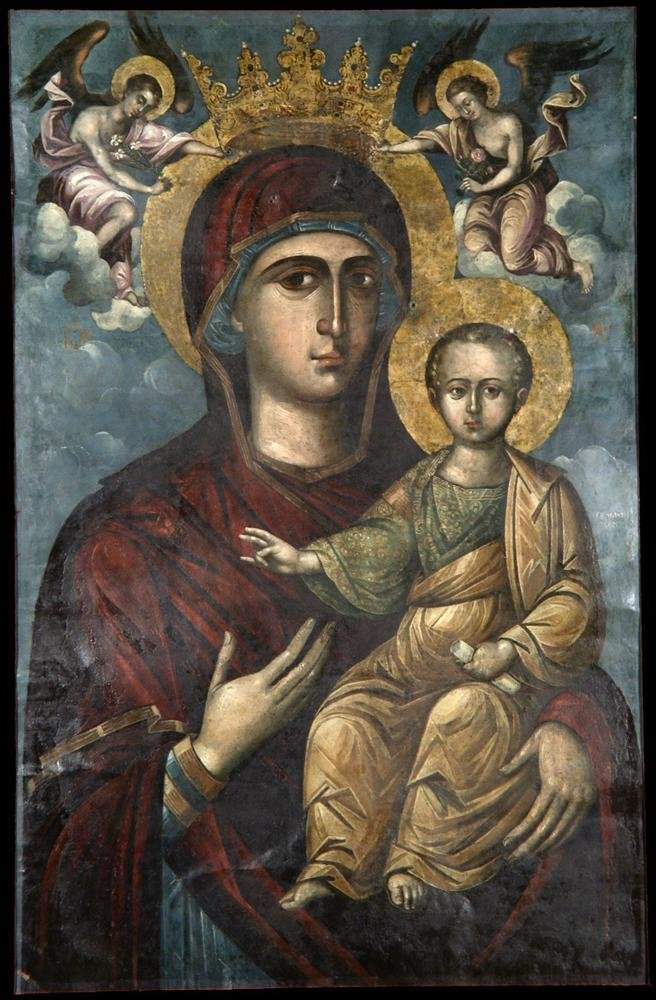
- Artist: Elias Moskos
- Year: c. 1650-1687
- Medium: tempera on wood
- Movement: Heptanese School
- Subject: Virgin and Child
- Dimensions: 98 cm × 63 cm (38.5 in × 24.8 in)
- Location: Benaki Museum, Athens, Greece
- Owner: Benaki Museum
- Website: Official Website

The Virgin and Child on Bronze is an egg tempera painting by Greek painter Elias Moskos. Moskos was originally from Crete. The painter migrated to Zakinthos. Two other painters with the name Moskos were active during his lifetime. They were Ioannis Moskos and Leos Moskos. All three painters were affiliated with Venice. Fifty-two of Elias's paintings survived. It is difficult to characterize the work of some painters belonging to the late Cretan School. Some artists also belong to the Heptanese School. The technical migration from the maniera Greca of Cretan-Venetian painting to the more refined Ionian-Venetian style is visible in the works of Elias Moskos and Theodoros Poulakis. His painting of the Virgin and Child drastically migrates from the traditional mannerism prevalent in Cretan painting. The painting clearly belongs to the Heptanese School. His painting of the Virgin and Child is at the Benaki Museum in Athens Greece.

== Description ==
The painting is egg tempera and bronze on a wood panel. Moskos chose bronze over the traditional gold leaf. Bronze was rarely used by painters. The height is 98 cm (38.5 in) and the width is 63 cm (24.8 in). The painting features the Virgin holding child Jesus. The position is the traditional Hodegetria. The painter used the traditional heavenly garment typical of Greek-Italian Byzantine painting. The artist refined the common prototype of the Cretan Renaissance. The flesh tones and features of both the Virgin and Child exhibit a shadowing technique. The artist adds more realism to the celestial beings. The curvature in the Virgin's face is apparent. The young infant exhibits clearer facial features and dimensions. The two angels crowning the Virgin are fully visible. The representatives of the celestial realm exhibit fuller features. The painter chooses to escape the traditional style of representing the angles. Their garments feature striations and folds of fabric. Part of their garments are floating in harmony with their lavishly painted wings. The angels are weightless figures in a spaceless setting. The most important part of the painting is the grey-toned background. The typical gold gilded background is replaced by dark cloudy variations of grey. The different tones and brush strokes relay the appearance of a dark cloudy day.

== Gallery ==
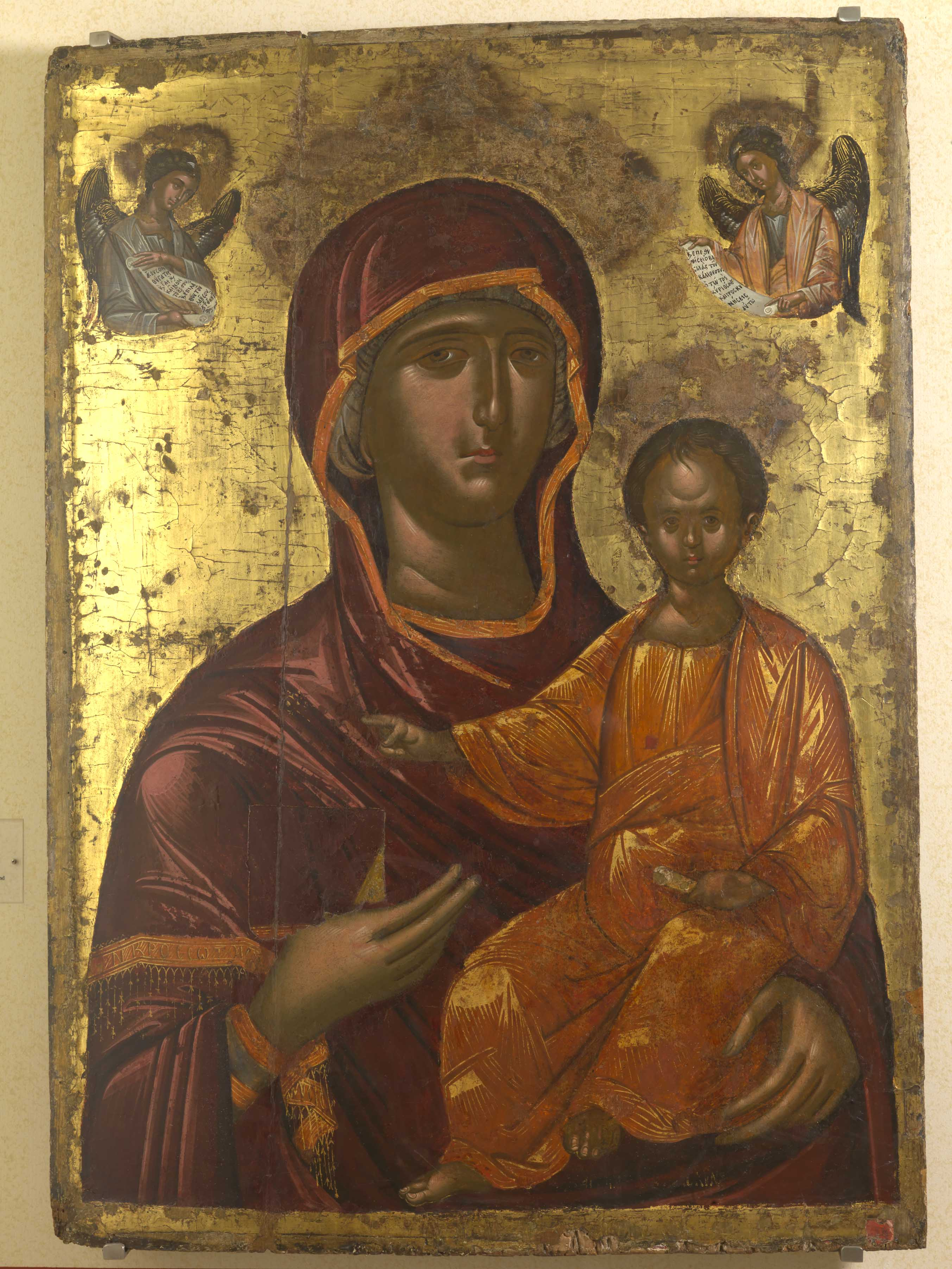
Virgin and Child Damaskinos

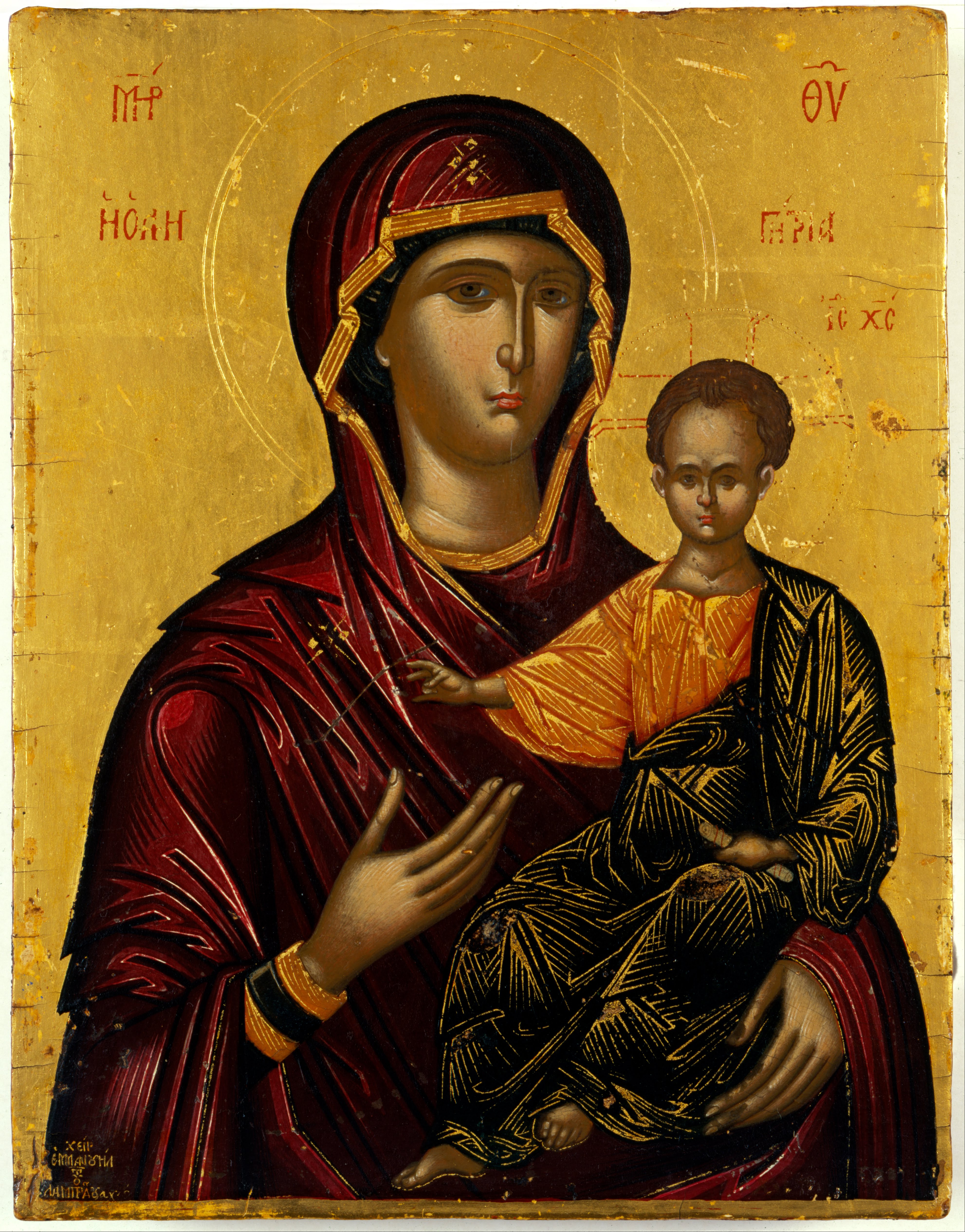
Virgin and Child Lambardos
