= Nikolaos Ritzos =

Greek painter (1440–1507)

Nicholas Ritzos
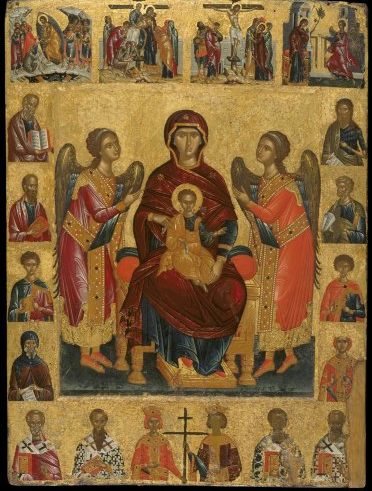
- Virgin Enthroned Holding the Christ
- Born: 1440; Heraklion, Republic of Venice
- Died: 1507 (aged 66–67); Heraklion, Republic of Venice
- Known for: Painting
- Movement: Cretan school
- Spouse: Francheskina Sakellari
- Children: Maneas

Nicholas Ritzos (Greek: Νικολάου Ρίτζου; 1440 – 1507; also known as Rizo and Ricio) was a Greek Renaissance painter. His father was famous painter Andreas Ritzos. His brother was painter Thomas Ritzos. His son was painter Manea Ritzos. Nicholas and his father Andreas Ritzos are the forefathers of the Cretan school of painting. They influenced countless artists both Greek and Italian. Their painting style was the typical Venetian influenced maniera greca in Crete. The island transitioned from the classical Byzantine painting to a more refined style. His contemporaries were Andreas Pavias, Nikolaos Tzafouris, and Angelos Akotantos. They influenced painters such as Michael Damaskinos, Petros Lambardos, and Emmanuel Lambardos. Nine of his works have survived.

== History ==
Nicholas was born in Heraklion. His father was Andreas Ritzos. His mother's name was Maria. He married Ioannis Sakellari's sister Francheskina Sakellari. He is first mentioned in a will with his father. His mother Maria died on August 24, 1482, in Heraklion. According to a document in the Venetian Archives. He split the inheritance with his father. Nicholas was also mentioned in documents relating to financial transactions between 1486 and 1492.

On September 11, 1499, he was hired by a monk of Mount Sinai who was in Heraklion named Gerasimos Kypraios to guard 24 important items. Nicholas may have created some of the artwork. The items consisted of sacred icons, triptychs, and shrines. The monk went on a trip to Mount Sinai. The archives stipulate that in the event the monk died Nicholas would send 16 icons to the monastery of Agios Antonio on the island of Rhodes. The remaining items would be sent to monasteries on the islands of Strofades and Amorgos.

Three of these icons have been identified by historians. Nicholas was also identified in several documents in Heraklion in 1503. On March 16, 1507, his wife was referred to as a widow. Historians are certain he died sometime between 1503 and 1507. His signature was χείρ Νικολάου Ρίτζου υός του μαΐστρου Ανδρέου

== Bibliography ==
- Hatzidakis, Manolis (1987). Greek painters after the fall (1450-1830) Volume A. Athens: Center for Modern Greek Studies E.I.E.
- Hatzidakis, Manolis & Drakopoulou, Eugenia (1997). Greek painters after the fall (1450-1830) Volume B. Athens: Center for Modern Greek Studies E.I.E.
- Drakopoulou, Eugenia (2010). Greek painters after the fall (1450-1830) Volume C. Athens: Center for Modern Greek Studies E.I.E.
