= Christ Enthroned (Moskos) =

Painting by Elias Moskos

- Ο Χριστός Ένθρονος (Greek), Cristo in Trono (Italian)
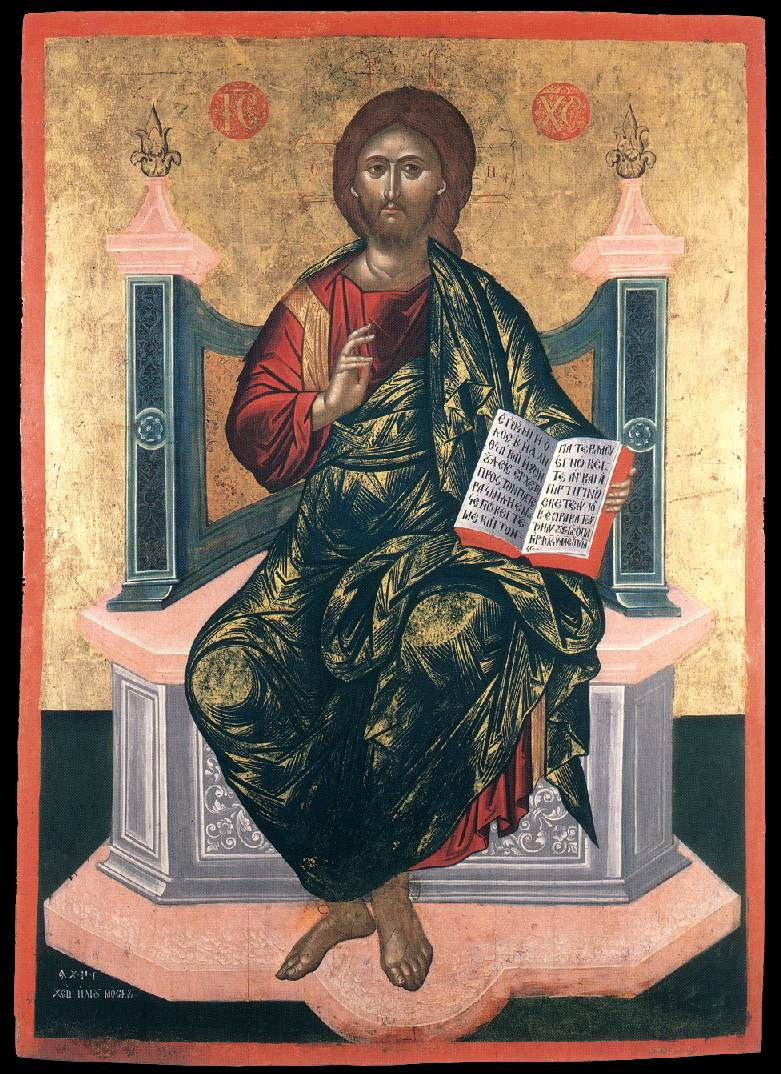
- Artist: Elias Moskos
- Year: c. 1653
- Medium: tempera on wood
- Movement: Late Cretan School
- Subject: Christ Enthroned
- Dimensions: 119 cm × 85 cm (46.8 in × 33.4 in)
- Location: Icon Museum Recklinghausen, Recklinghausen, Germany
- Owner: Icon Museum Recklinghausen

Christ Enthroned is a tempera painting by Elias Moskos, a representative of the Late Cretan School. The artist was also associated with the Heptanese School due to his migration to Zakinthos and the transition of his painting style. Moskos also taught painting. Most of his students became church committee members. Church committees were responsible for commissioning paintings. He was active from 1645 to 1687 on the islands of Crete, Zakynthos, and Kefalonia. Fifty-two of his works survived, over half of them were signed. Two other painters named Moskos were active during the same period Ioannis Moskos and Leos Moskos.

Christ Enthroned was a popular theme among Italian and Greek Byzantine painters. The subject has been depicted since the inception of the new religion. The figure was usually painted in the apse of Byzantine churches. The Cretan School adopted the style. Angelos Akotantos painted one of the earliest signed works in the 1400s. His icon was the framework for later painters of the maniera greca. Moskos painted his own version and significantly refined it. Emmanuel Tzanes painted his own version around the same period. The Moskos version is located at the Icon Museum in Recklinghausen, Germany. It was formerly part of the Minken Collection in London.

== Description ==
The painting is egg tempera and gold leaf on wood. The icon features a height of 119 cm (46.8 in) and a width of 85 cm (33.4 in). The work was completed in 1653. Christ is seated on his traditional throne. He is holding an open book. The book features the typical Greek text. The Christ figure is smaller than the Angelos. The icon is heavily decorative. Clear lines are visible throughout the image. The artist chose green and red. The painting heavily follows the maniera greca. The gilded gold background is mostly intact. The inscription is clearly visible. The painter creates a shallow stage for the heavenly figure of Christ. The flesh tones and hair are painted with intricate detail. The artist uses a shadowing technique. The folds of fabric feature striations. The throne illustrates depth it is painted symmetrically and the figure is clearly distinguishable. The throne is made up of three parts. The bottom, the middle, and the top. The bottom portion features, diagonal lines, straight lines, and a half-circle. The middle portion of the throne exactly where the figure is seated features clear diagonal lines. The top part features two symmetric three-dimensional pyramidal wood posts topped by a Cretan renaissance-style decorative ornament.

== Gallery ==
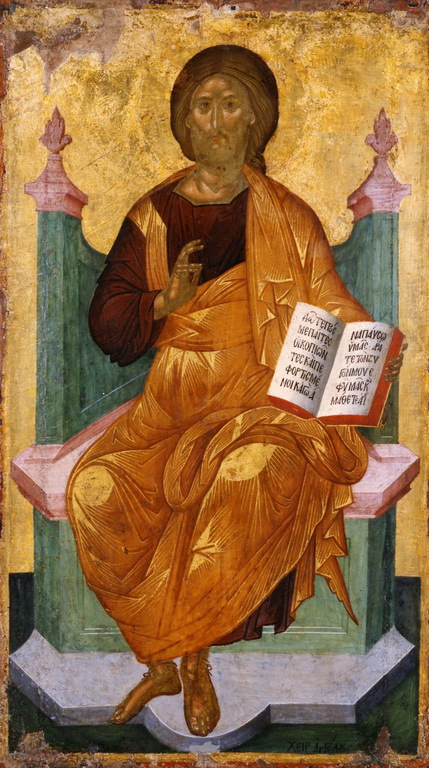
Christ Enthroned Angelos

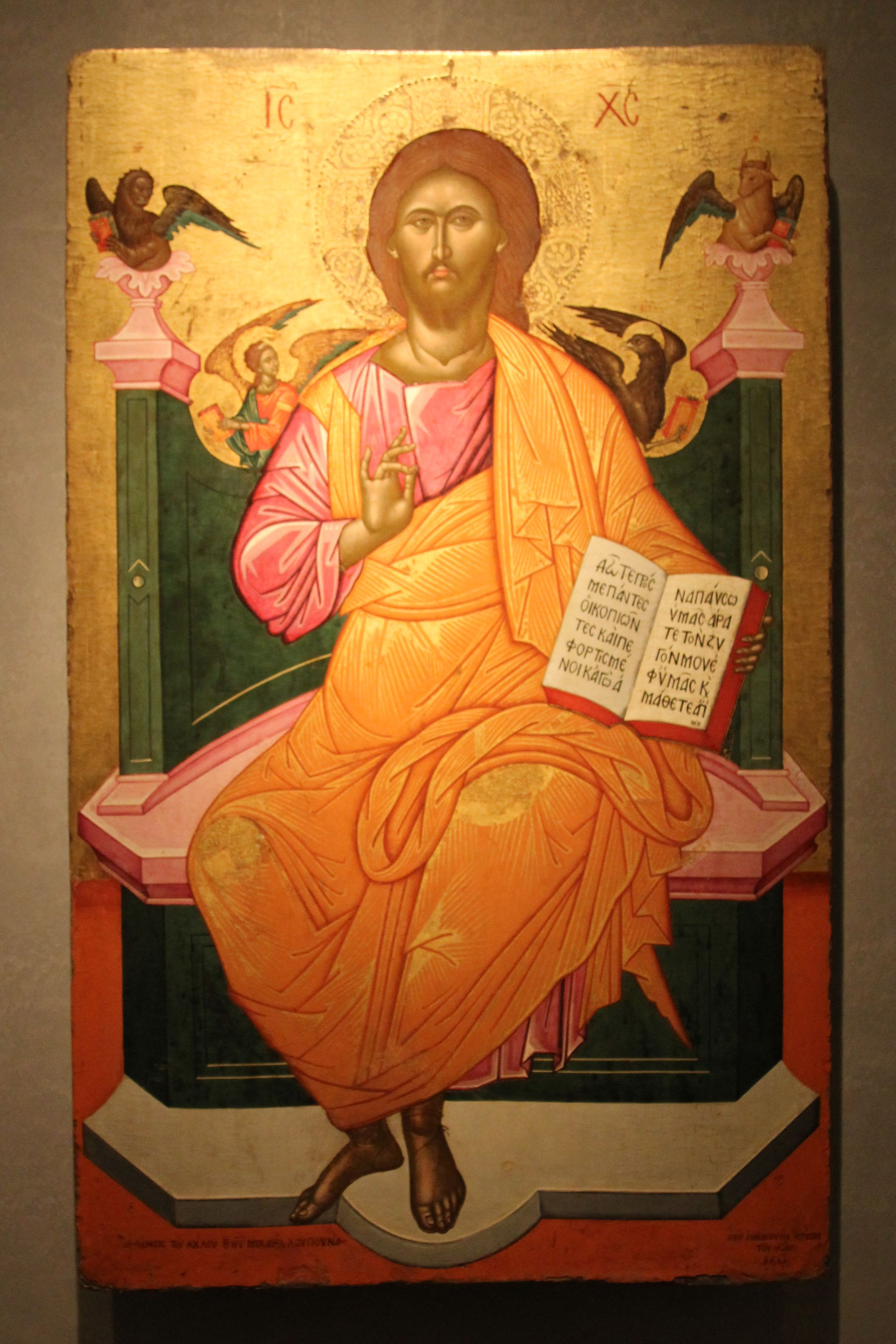
Christ Enthroned Tzanes

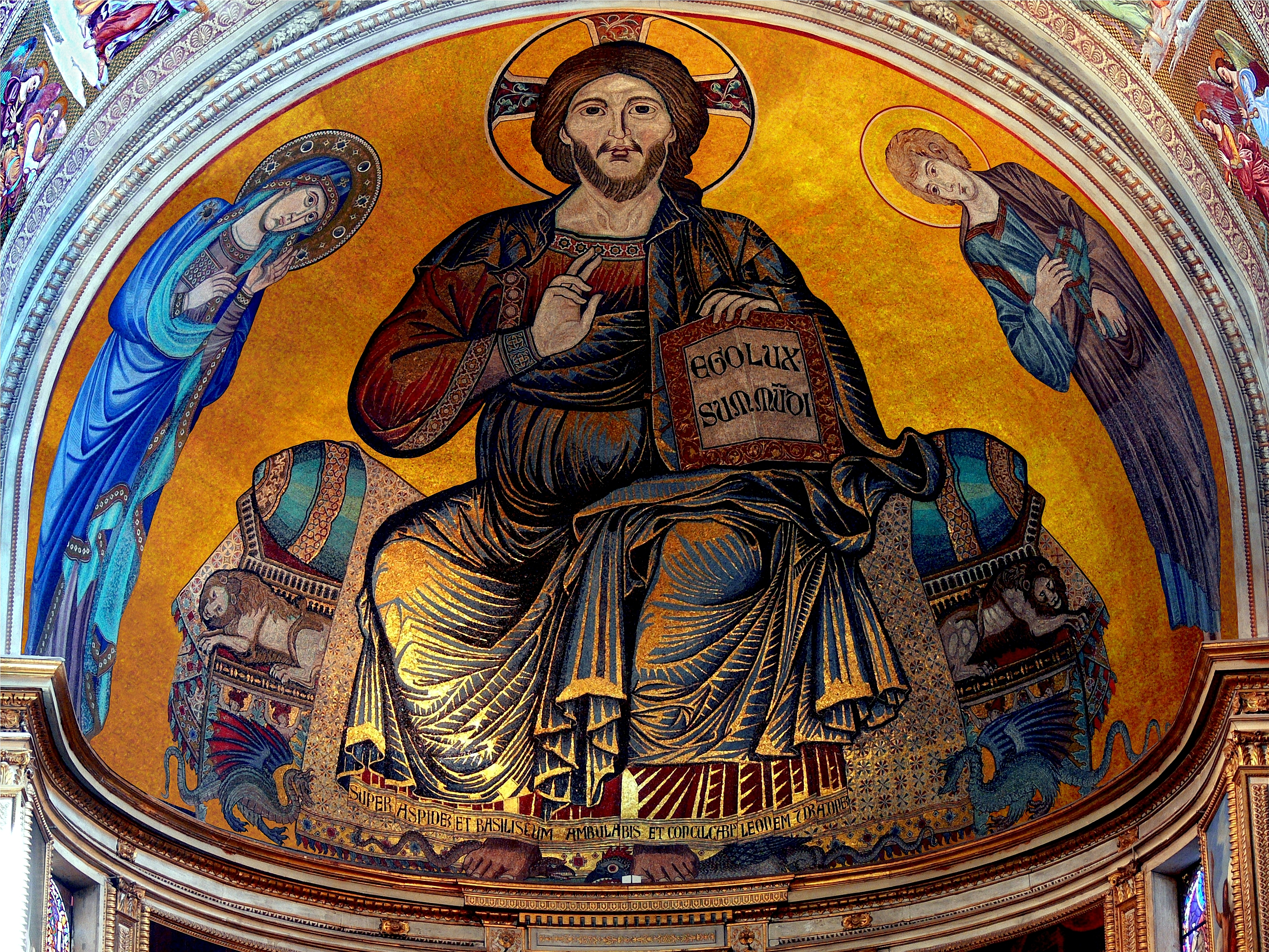
Christ Enthroned Cimabue
