= Emmanuel Lambardos =

Cretan painter

Emmanuel Lampardos
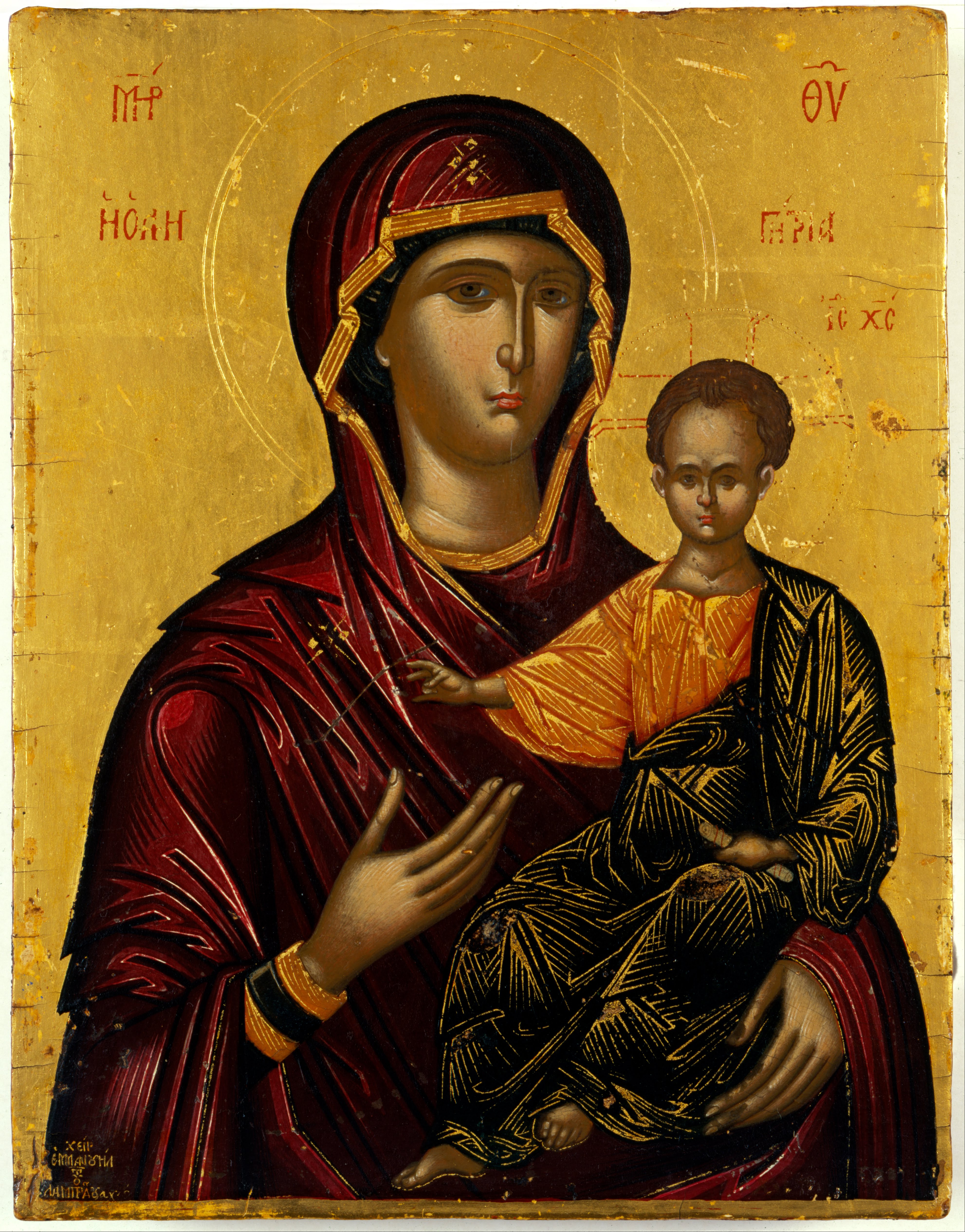
- Virgin and Child
- Born: 1555-65; Rethymno, Crete
- Died: 1640; Rethymno, Crete
- Known for: Iconography and hagiography
- Movement: Cretan School

Emmanuel Lampardos (Greek: Εμμανουήλ Λαμπάρδος, 1567 –1631), also known as Emmanouil Lampardos and Manolitzis. He was a Cretan Renaissance painter. Emmanuel and his nephew Emmanuel Lampardos have been very difficult to distinguish because they were active painters around the same period. Countless Greek and Italian artists emulated the famous painters. The name Lampardos was very notable in reference to Cretan art. The family was affiliated with famous painters Franghias Kavertzas and Tzortzi Papadopoulo. Lampardos emulated Georgios Klontzas, Michael Damaskinos, Angelos Akotantos, Andreas Pavias, Andreas Ritzos and Nikolaos Tzafouris. His style was the typical maniera greca with a strong Venetian influence. Countless images of the virgin and child have survived. Lampardos influenced Franghias Kavertzas, Emmanuel Tzanes, Philotheos Skoufos Elias Moskos, Leos Moskos, Ioannis Moskos and Emmanuel Tzanfournaris. Over fifty-six icons have been attributed to Lampardos.

== History ==
Lampardos was born in Rethymno Crete. He was a member of a prominent family. His father's name was Papa-Nicholas. He had an active workshop in Heraklion. His entire family were painters. His brothers were Pierou and Tzane Lampardos. His nephews were famous painters Emmanuel, Mari, Tzortzi, Nicholas, and Stamati Lampardos. The second Emmanuel Lampardos which historians have a hard time distinguishing from the first was the son of Pierou. The only information available about Emmanuel Lampardos the Elder are notary archives from 1587 until 1631. One such record discusses the sale of a vineyard, the name on the contract was Manolitzis Lampardos, son of the Papa-Nikolaos.

Emmanuel Lampardos the Younger was also born in Rethymno Crete his father was Pierou. It is difficult to distinguish the younger from the elder. His brothers were Mari and Tzortzi. He is mentioned in records from 1623 to about 1641. In the first record, he is mentioned as a witness in notarized documents. He is also referred to as Manolitzis the nickname for Emmanuel. In 1641, he signed a contract with famous painter Tzortzi Papadopoulo for the payment of a painting by Franghias Kavertzas. The final record of Emmanuel Lampardos the Younger was as a witness on July 21, 1644.

There is no way to separate the elder from the younger. Research is still underway in the field of the Cretan School to correctly attribute the signatures and painting styles. The paintings were signed χείρ 'Εμμανουήλ του Λαμπάρδου, χείρ Έμαννουήλ Λαμπάρδου, του Λαμπάρδου, Εμμανουήλ του Λαμπάρδου χείρ, χειρ Εμ[μ]αν[ουηλ]. The artists known as Emmanuel Lampardos have influenced countless Greek and Italian painters and the family Lampardos had many very famous painters. Many of their works survive today.

== Gallery ==
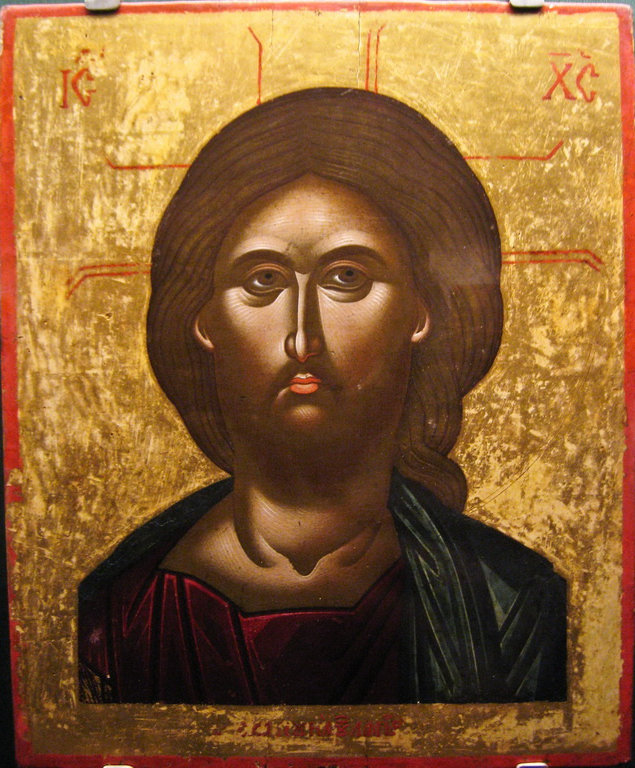
Jesus

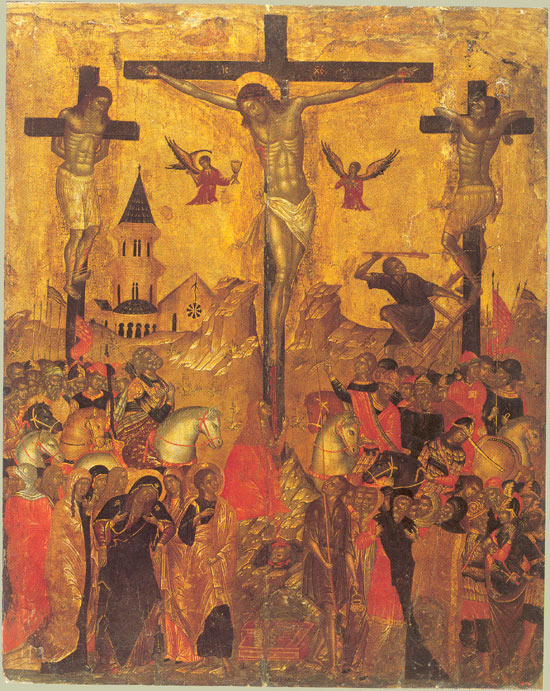
Crucifixion

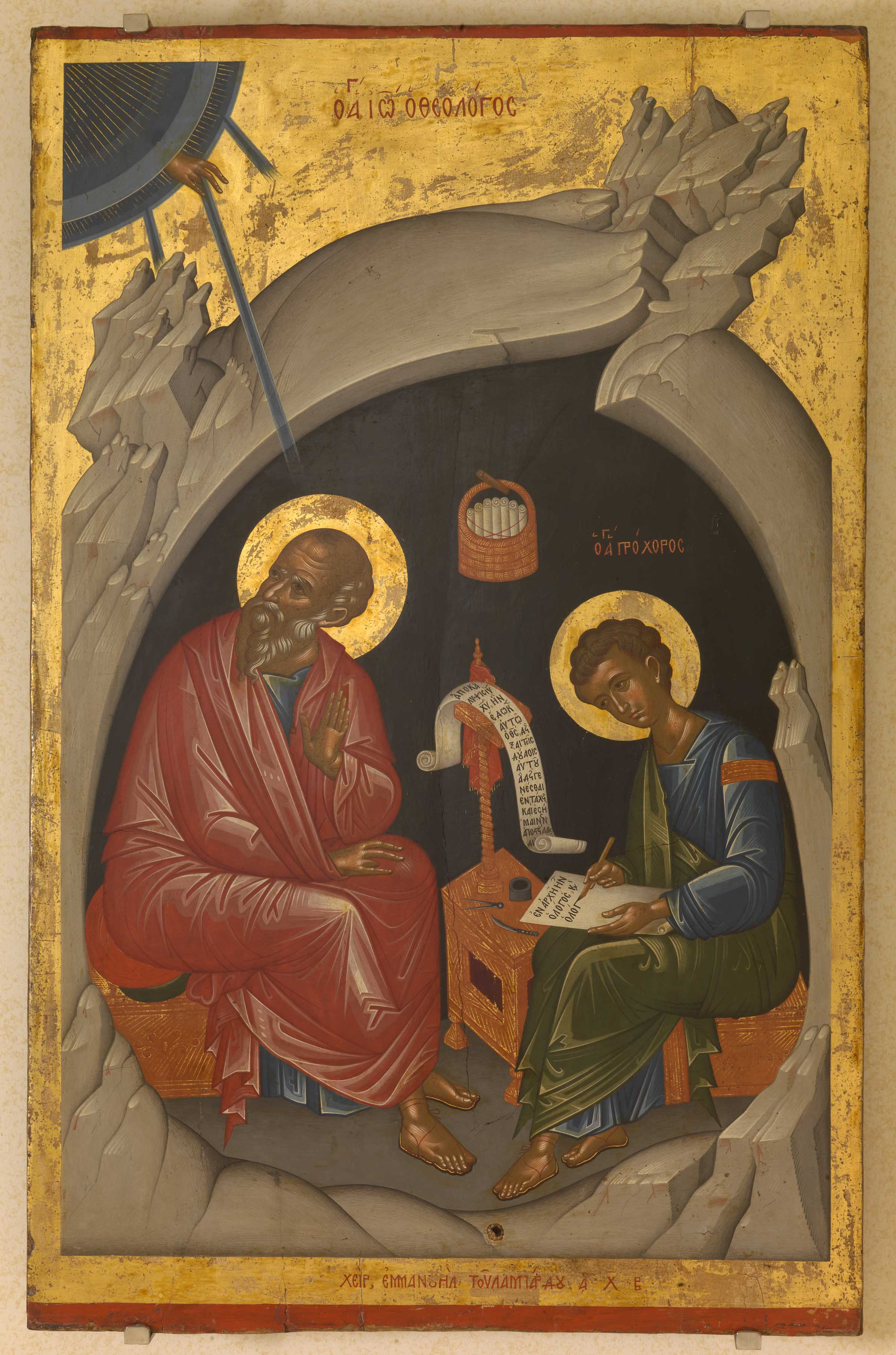
John the Evangelist

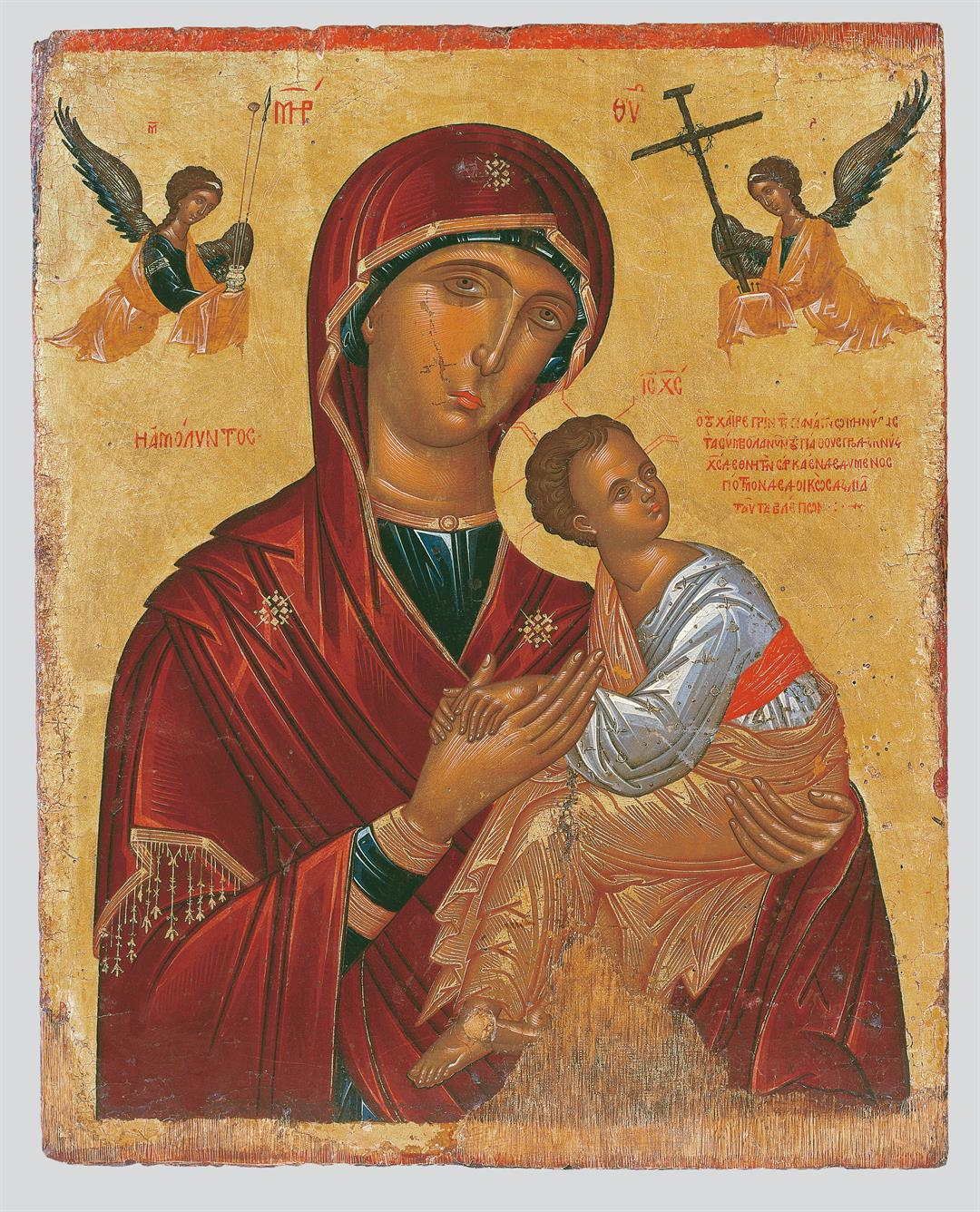
Mother and Child

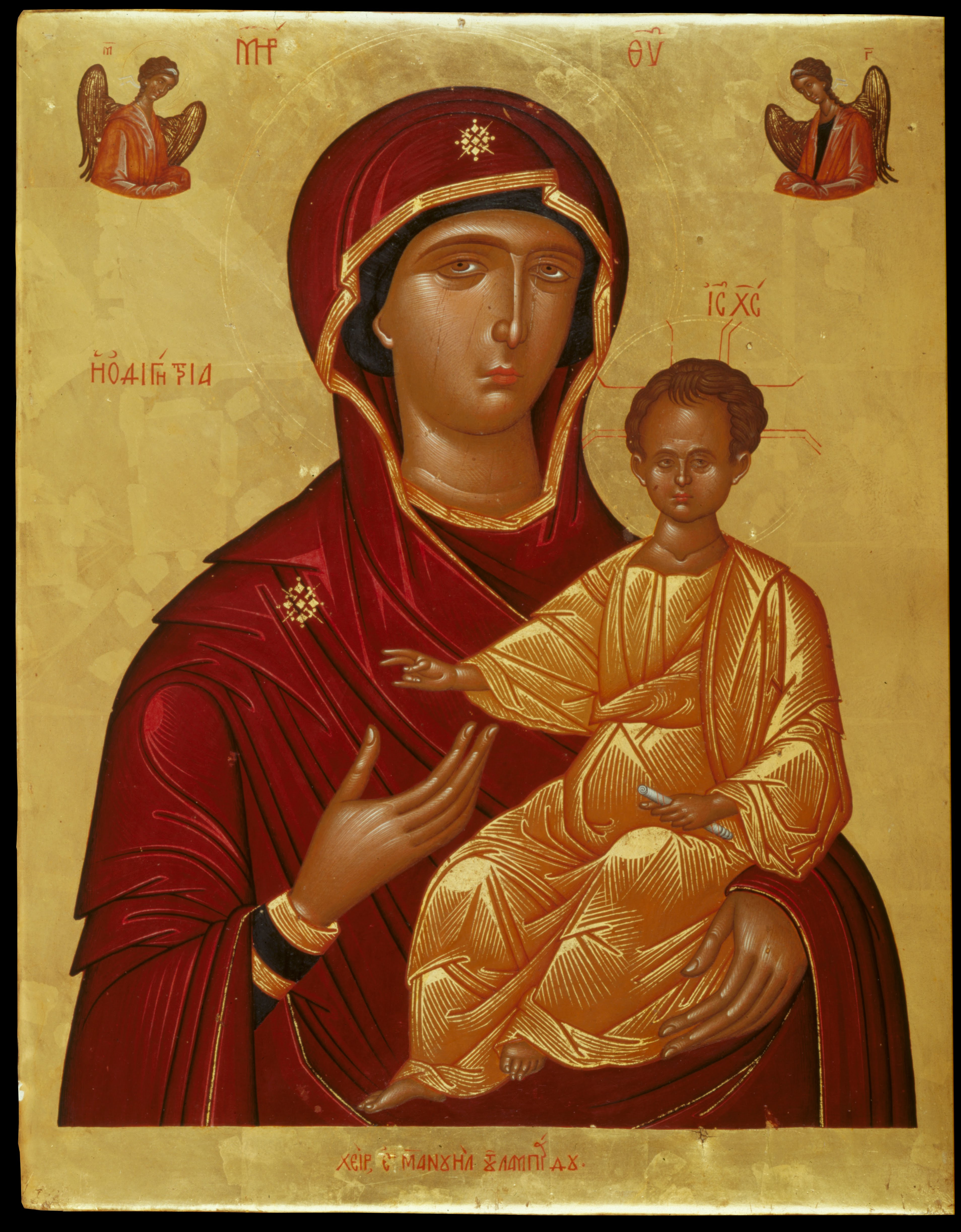
Mother and Child

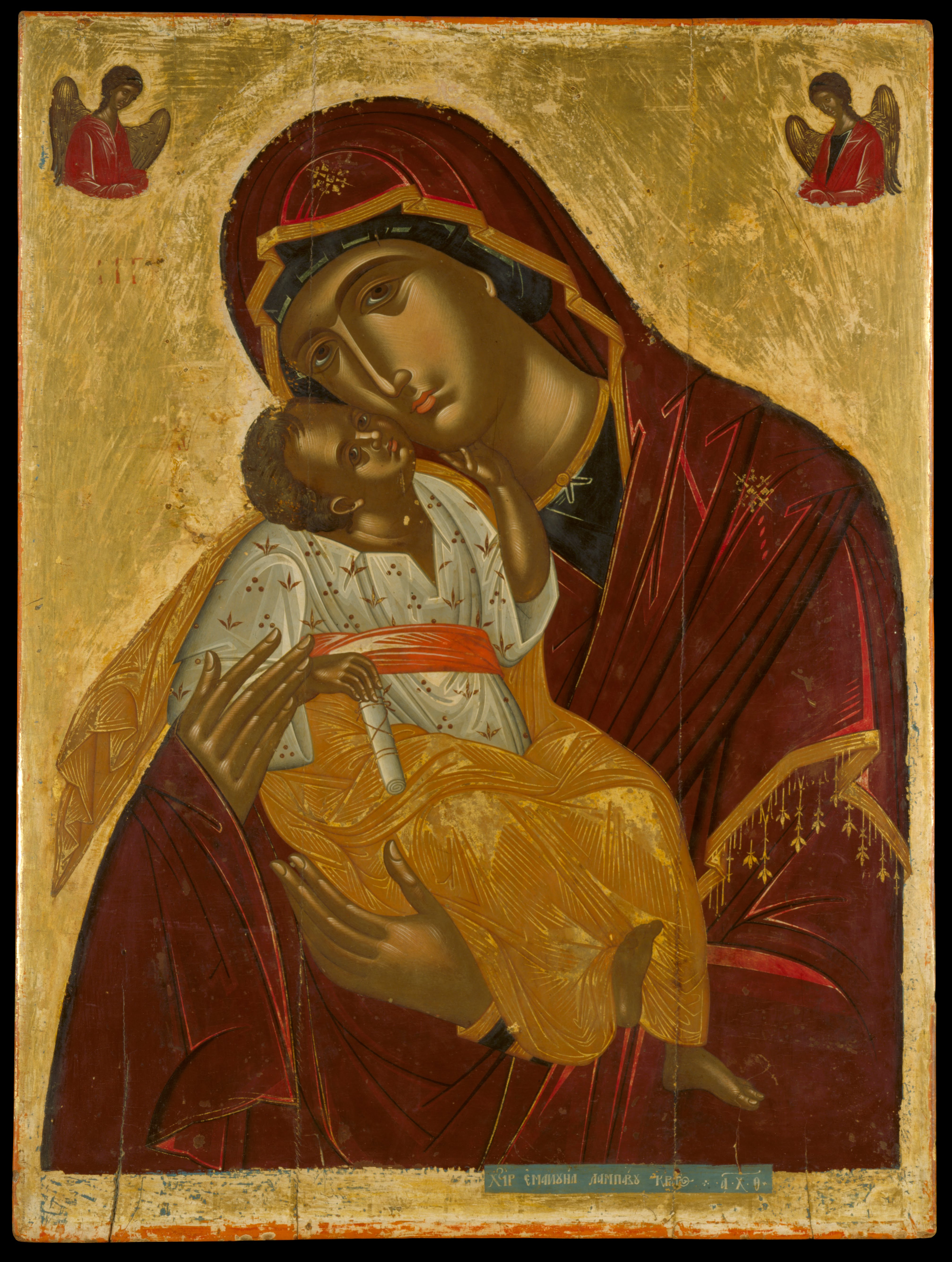
Mother and Child

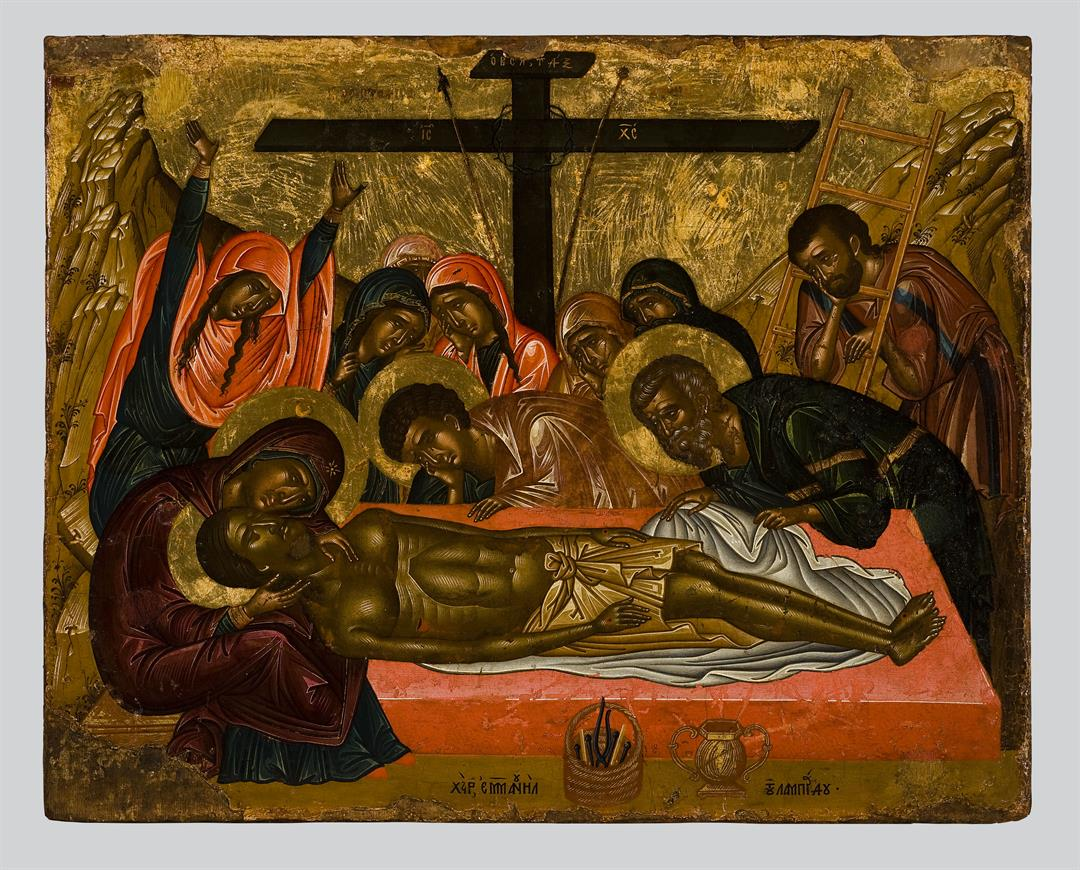
Lamentation

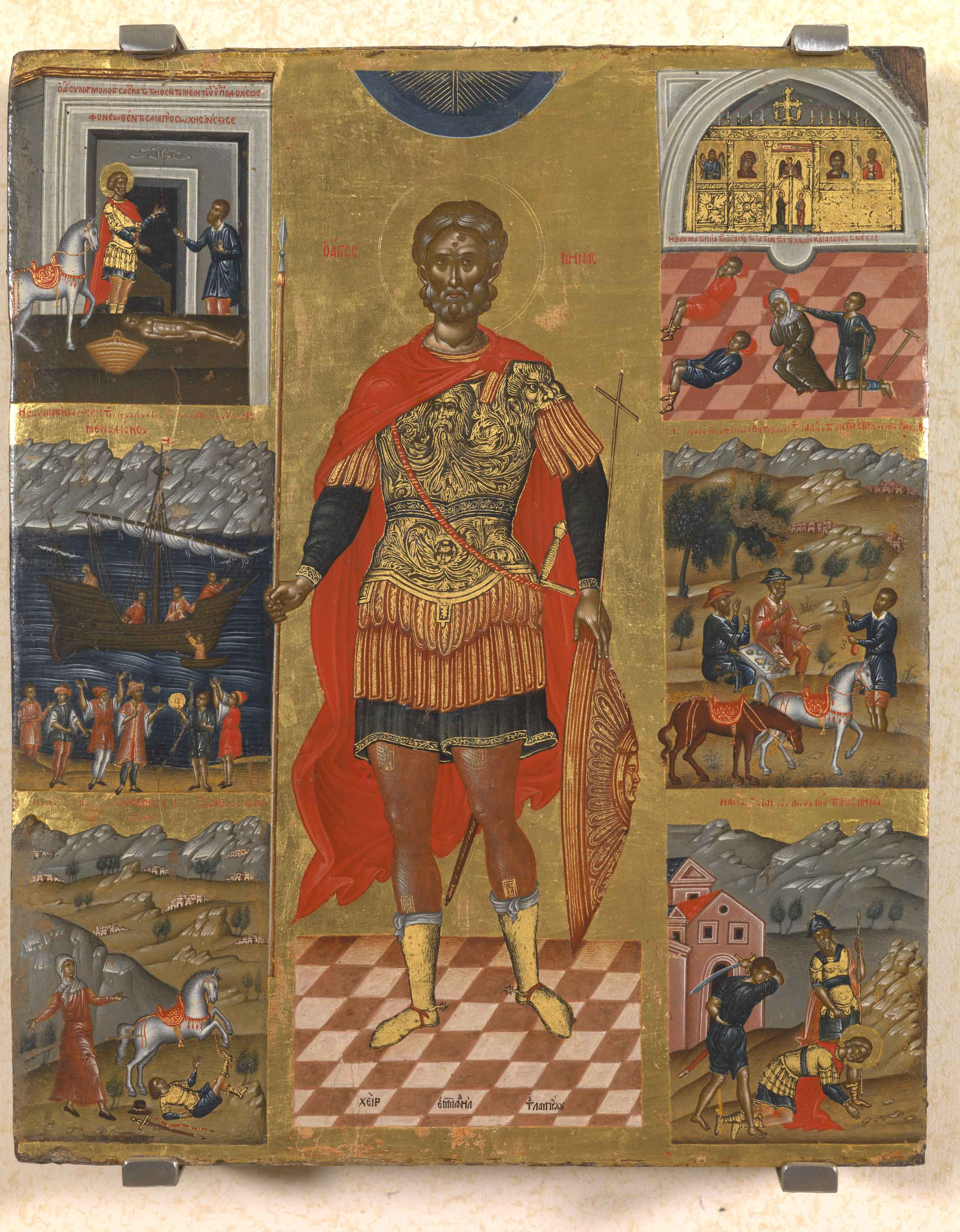
Saint Minas

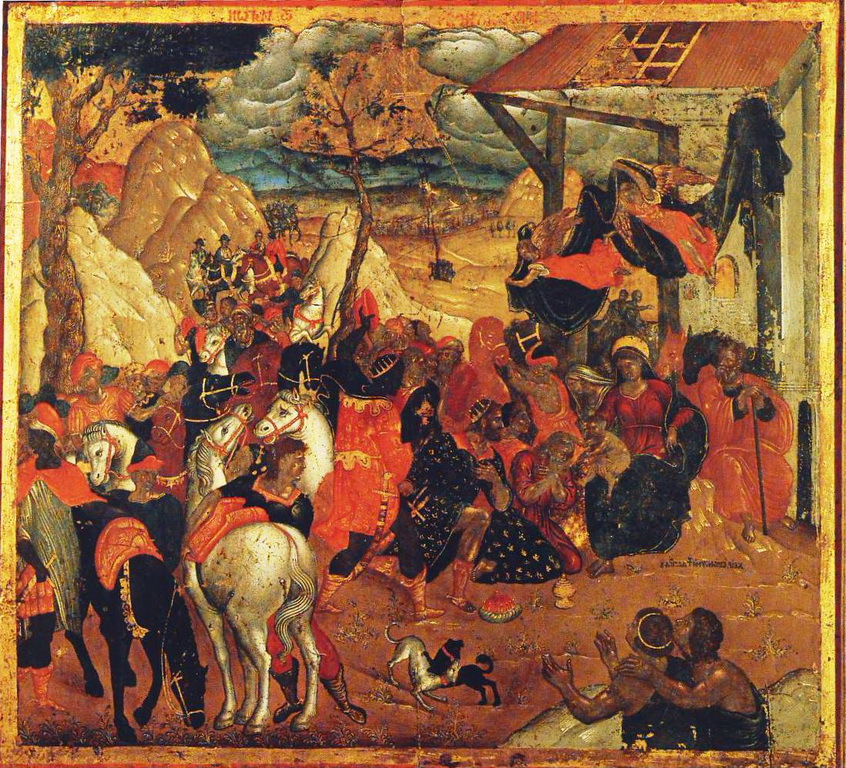
The Three Magi

== Notable works ==
- Constantinos and Helen Greek Orthodox Church of Jerusalem
- ΘΚ Byzantine and Christian Museum

== See also ==
- Petros Lambardos
- Εuphrosynos

== Bibliography ==
- Hatzidakis, Manolis (1987). Έλληνες Ζωγράφοι μετά την Άλωση (1450-1830). Τόμος 1: Αβέρκιος - Ιωσήφ [Greek Painters after the Fall of Constantinople (1450-1830). Volume 1: Averkios - Iosif]. Athens: Center for Modern Greek Studies, National Research Foundation. hdl:10442/14844. ISBN 960-7916-01-8.
- Hatzidakis, Manolis; Drakopoulou, Evgenia (1997). Έλληνες Ζωγράφοι μετά την Άλωση (1450-1830). Τόμος 2: Καβαλλάρος - Ψαθόπουλος [Greek Painters after the Fall of Constantinople (1450-1830). Volume 2: Kavallaros - Psathopoulos]. Athens: Center for Modern Greek Studies, National Research Foundation. hdl:10442/14088. ISBN 960-7916-00-X.
- Drakopoulou, Evgenia (2010). Έλληνες Ζωγράφοι μετά την Άλωση (1450–1830). Τόμος 3: Αβέρκιος - Ιωσήφ [Greek Painters after the Fall of Constantinople (1450–1830). Volume 3: Averkios - Joseph]. Athens, Greece: Center for Modern Greek Studies, National Research Foundation. ISBN 978-960-7916-94-5.
