= Elias Moskos =

Greek educator, shipping merchant and painter (died 1687)

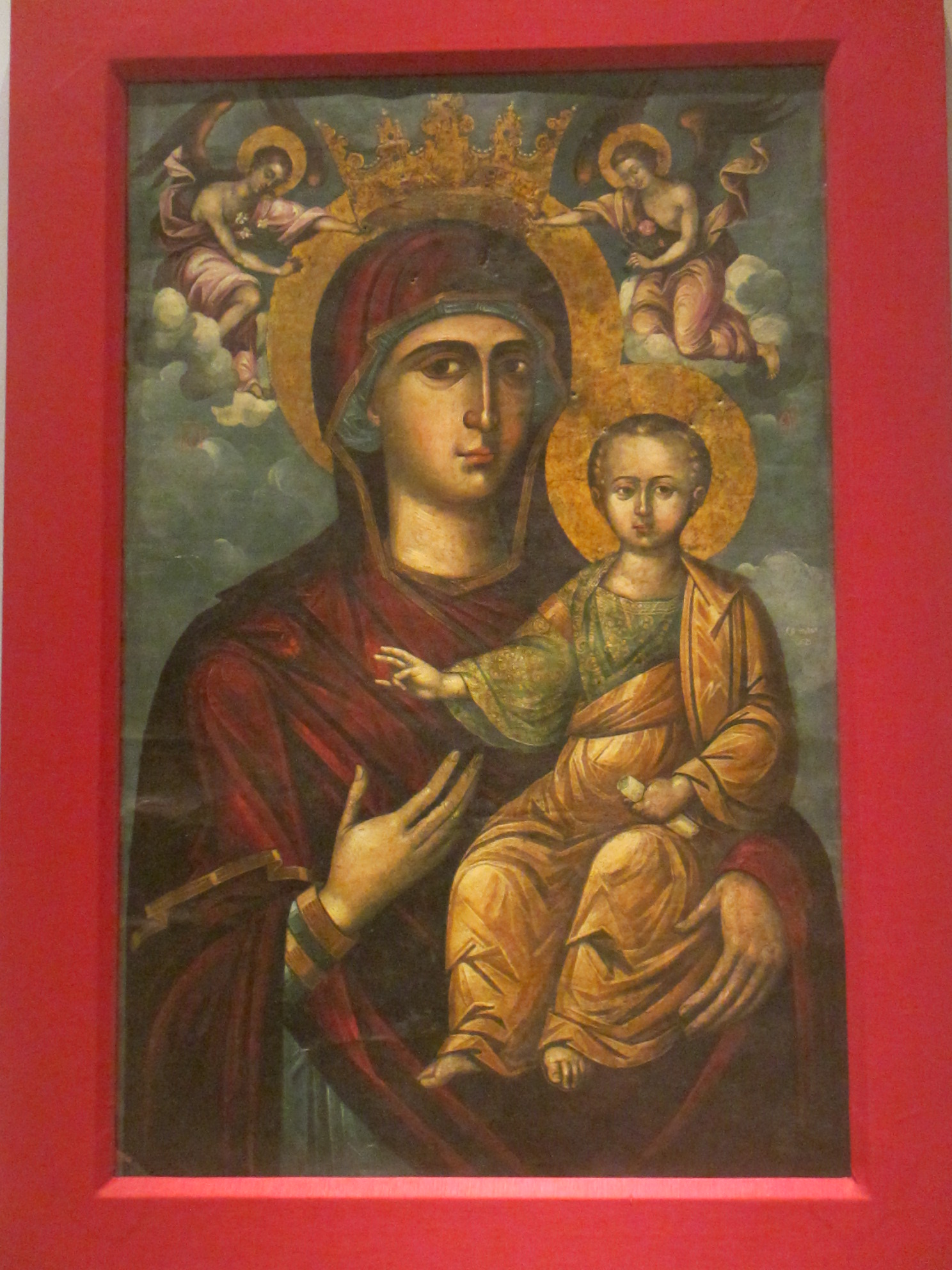
- Madonna and Child
- Born: early 1600s Rethymno, Crete
- Died: January 26, 1687; Zakynthos
- Resting place: Phaneromeni Church, Zakynthos
- Movement: Cretan school Heptanese school

Ilias or Elias Moskos (Greek: Ηλίας Μόσκος; 1620/1629- January 26, 1687) was a Greek educator, shipping merchant and painter from Crete. The last name Moskos was associated with three famous painters of the Cretan school alive during the same period, along with Ioannis Moskos and Leos Moskos, possibly his relatives. Elias incorporated maniera greca with the Venetian style. Theodore Poulakis and Moskos brought the art and style of Crete into the Heptanese school of the Ionian Islands. Some of his work was inspired by Angelos Akotantos. He was affiliated with other artists such as Philotheos Skoufos. He is often confused with Leos Moskos. His son was not Ioannis Moskos although they were probably related. Elias most popular painting is Christ Pantocrator. Fifty-two of his paintings survived.

== History ==
Elias was born in Rethymno, Crete. His father's name was Ioannis. He was a painter, shipping merchant, and teacher. He eventually married and had two children George and Maria. Two other painters were active during this period with the same last name. Ioannis Moskos and Leos Moskos they may have been related. He migrated to the Ionian islands. He was active on the island of Zakynthos and Kefalonia. Luckily, he signed many of his icons. According to Venetian records, in 1649 he taught painting to Symeon Maroudas. That same year he agreed to paint scenes in different spaces inside the church Agios Theodore in Katastari, namely the pillars.

In 1653, he taught K. Arvanitaki painting. In 1655, he made his students Symeon Maroudas, and Α. Arissaio church committee members. Committee members decided which artists were chosen to paint for the churches. His other student M. Patzo was also a committee member in 1657. During the years 1659-1666 Moskos was heavily involved in the shipping industry in Zakynthos. He was also responsible for building a ship and appointing church committee members in Corfu and Venice.

On October 12, 1666, Elias became very ill. He made out a will leaving his fortune to his brother George. Historians have deduced that he was not married with children at the time. He also had a sizable fortune. He had financial dealings with Corfu and Kefalonia. His final wishes were to be buried at the Monastery of Saint John at Langada Katastari. He gave the Monastery his house with a courtyard and his boat.

He gave special instructions to the monks for his funeral and memorial. If his instructions were not followed correctly the donation would go to another monastery. He would also cancel the donation of an icon of the Ascension of Jesus Christ to the church of Faneromeni Zakynthos. There was also an icon of the Archangel Michael in the church of Agia Sophia in the village of Koukesi, Zakynthos with his signature. On January 8, 1687, he wrote another will where he wanted to be buried at Faneromeni, Zakynthos. His heirs at this point were his two children George and Maria. He left them a massive fortune. Elias died on January 26, 1687.

He began to employ Italian mannerism. This is apparent in Jacobs Latter. The artist creates clear foreground and background. His use of color is also different from the traditional Greek mannerism. Theodore Poulakis is considered the father of Heptanese school because of his drastic transition to the new style of painting but Moskos is also an important member of the transition to the more refined style of the Heptanese school of the Ionian Islands. Philotheos Skoufos was a witness in a legal document for Moskos in 1677. The evidence indicates both artists interacted. Elias is sometimes confused with Leos Moskos.

Elias painted his famous piece Christ Pantocrator in the Ionian Islands. The icon is housed in the Icon Museum Recklinghausen. The museum contains the largest Orthodox Style art collection outside of the Orthodox world.

== Gallery ==
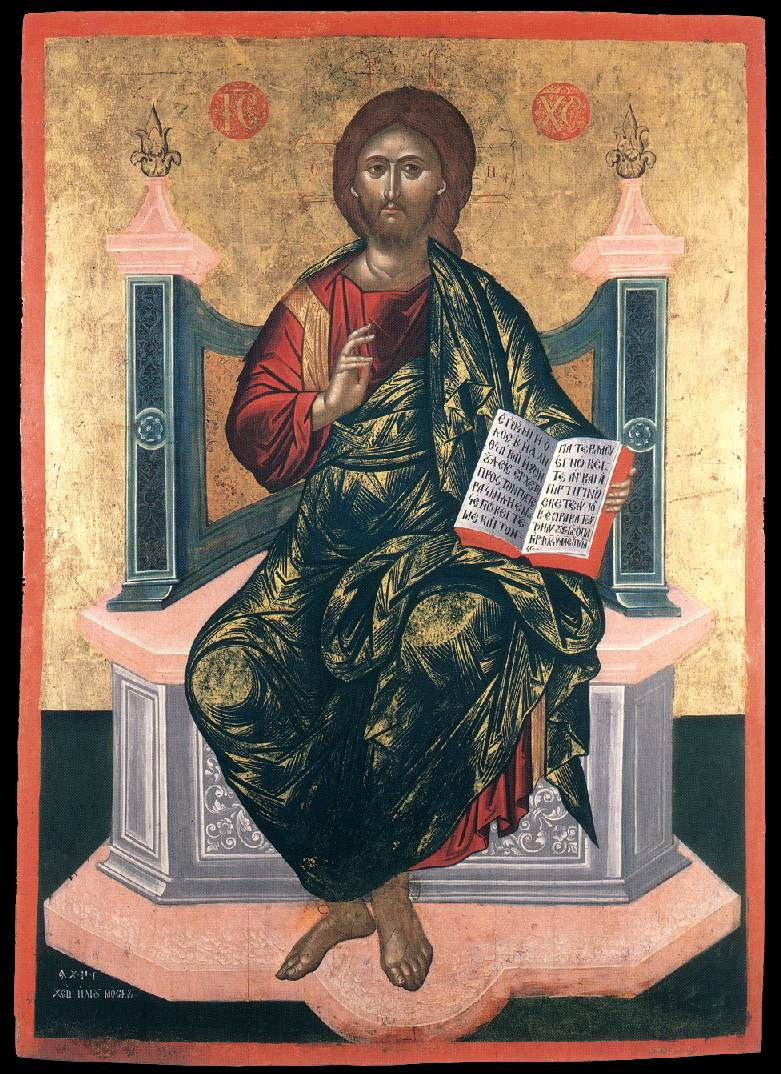
Christ Pantocrator

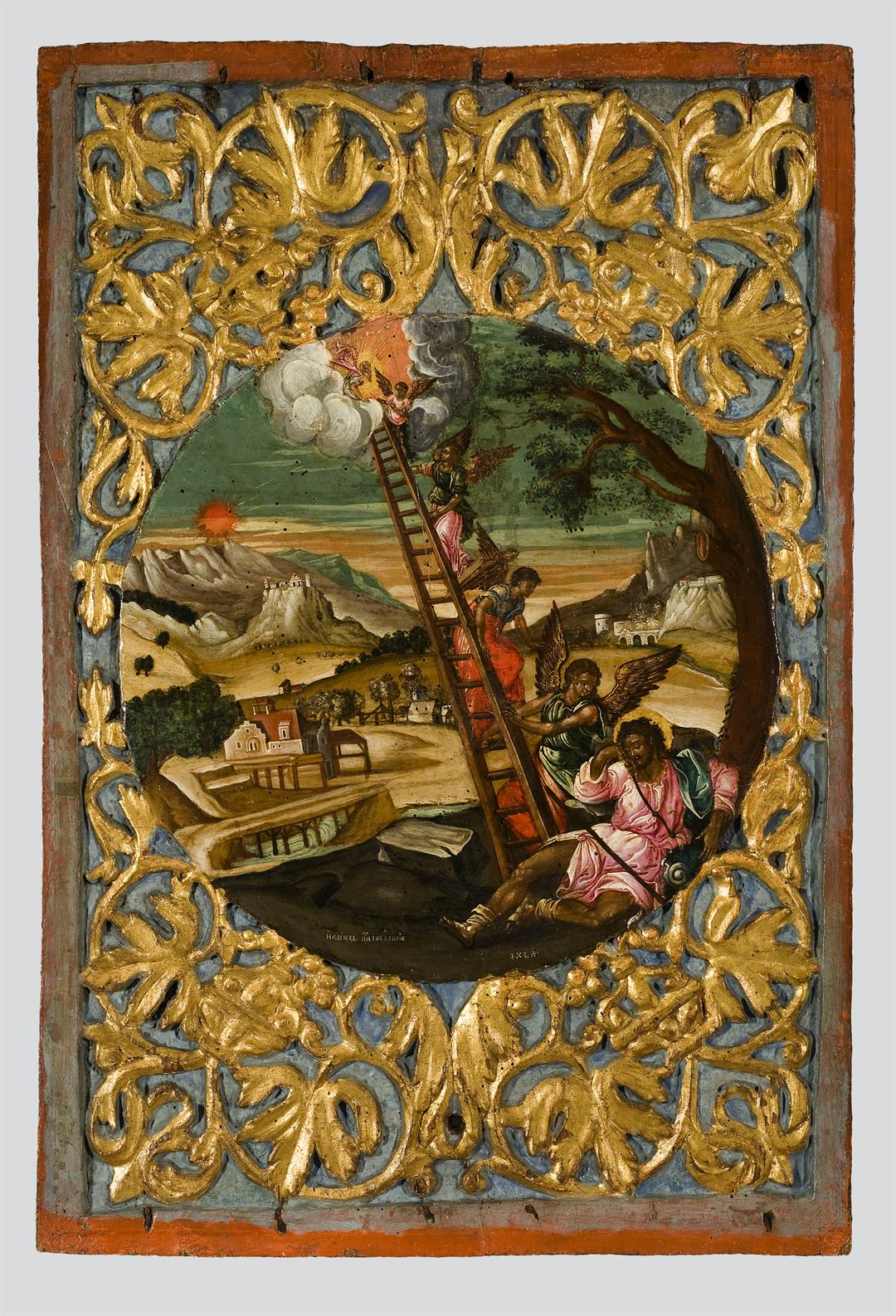
Jacob's Ladder

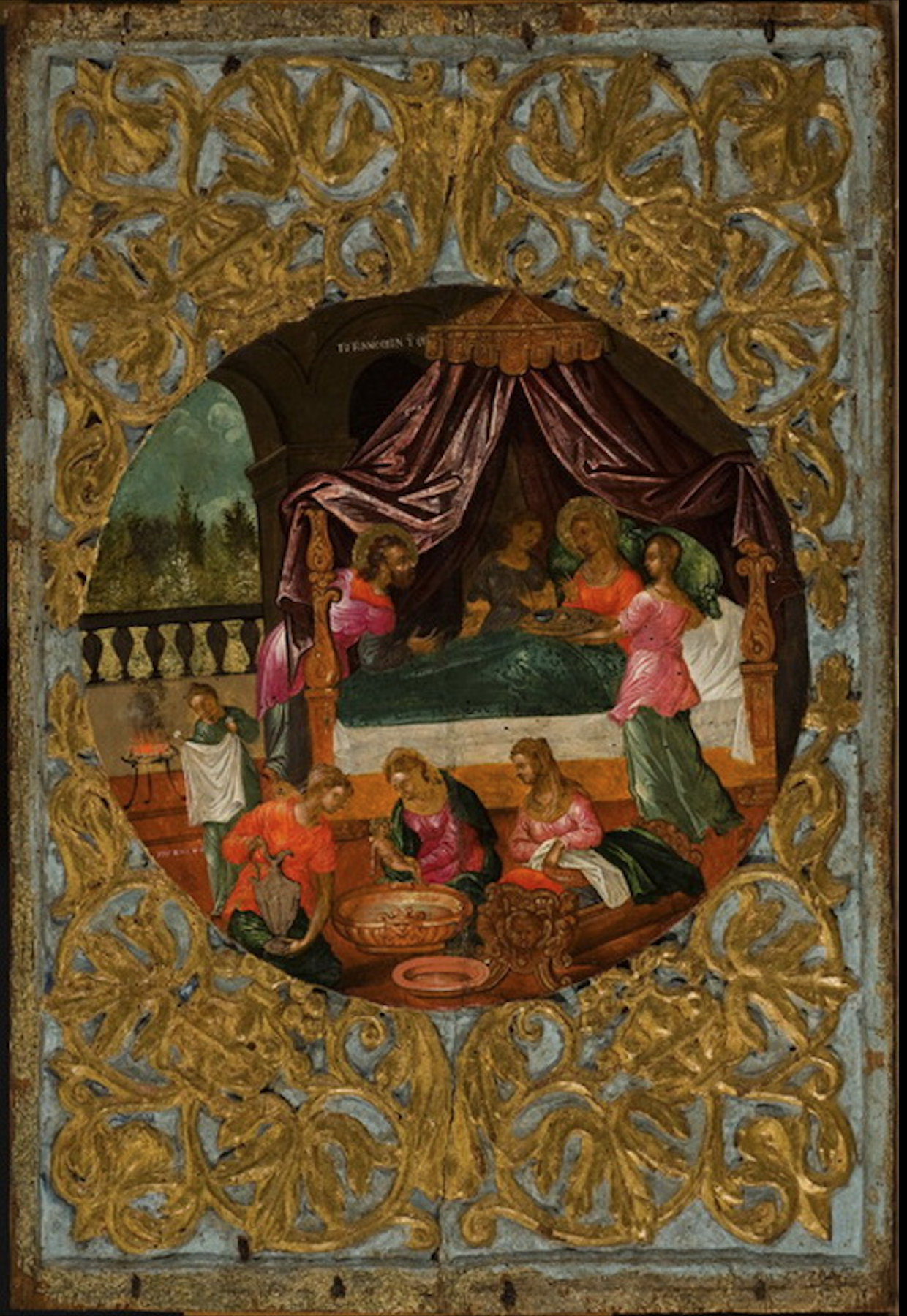
Birth of the Virgin 1661 Byzantine Museum

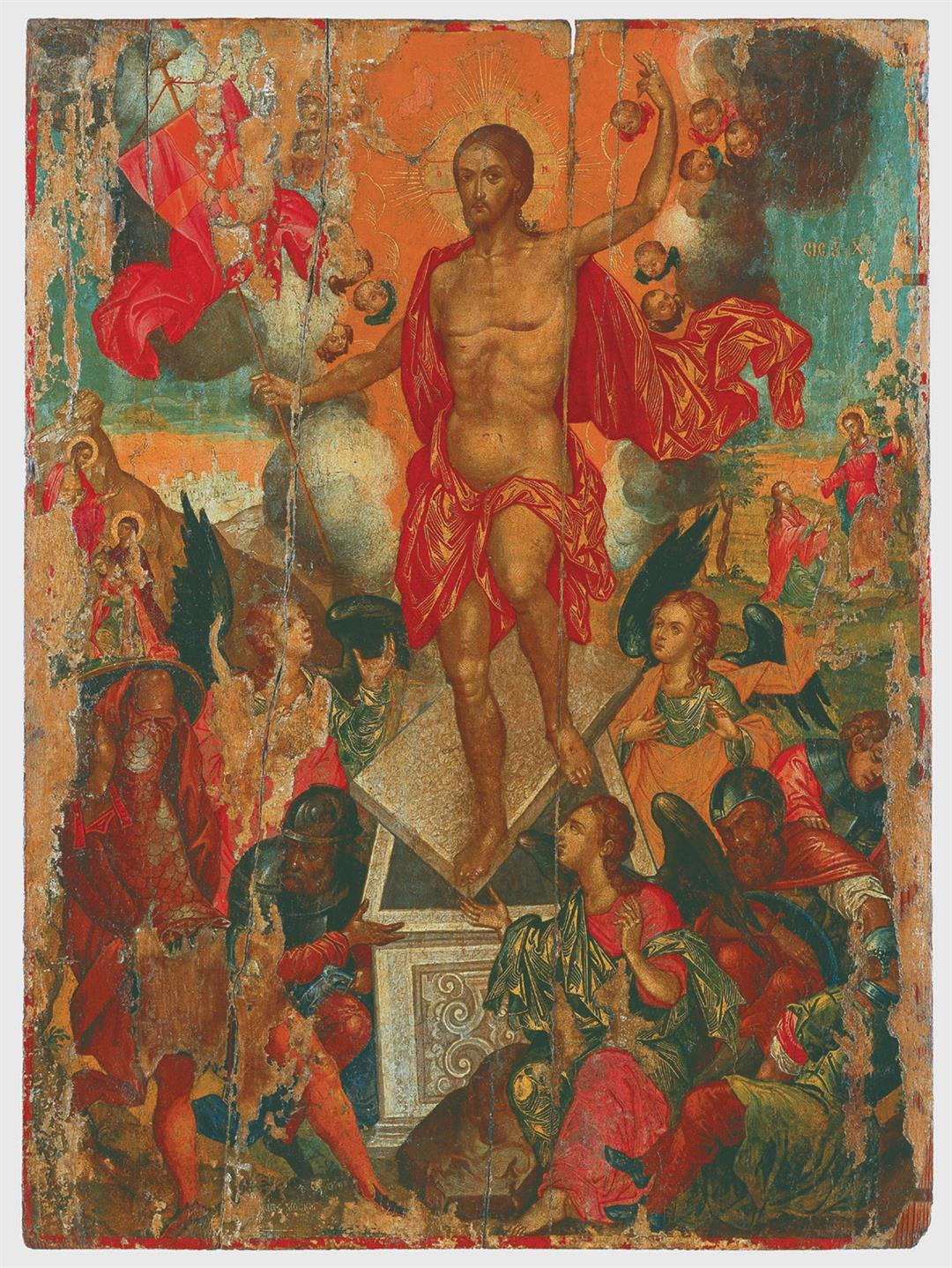
Resurrection 1679

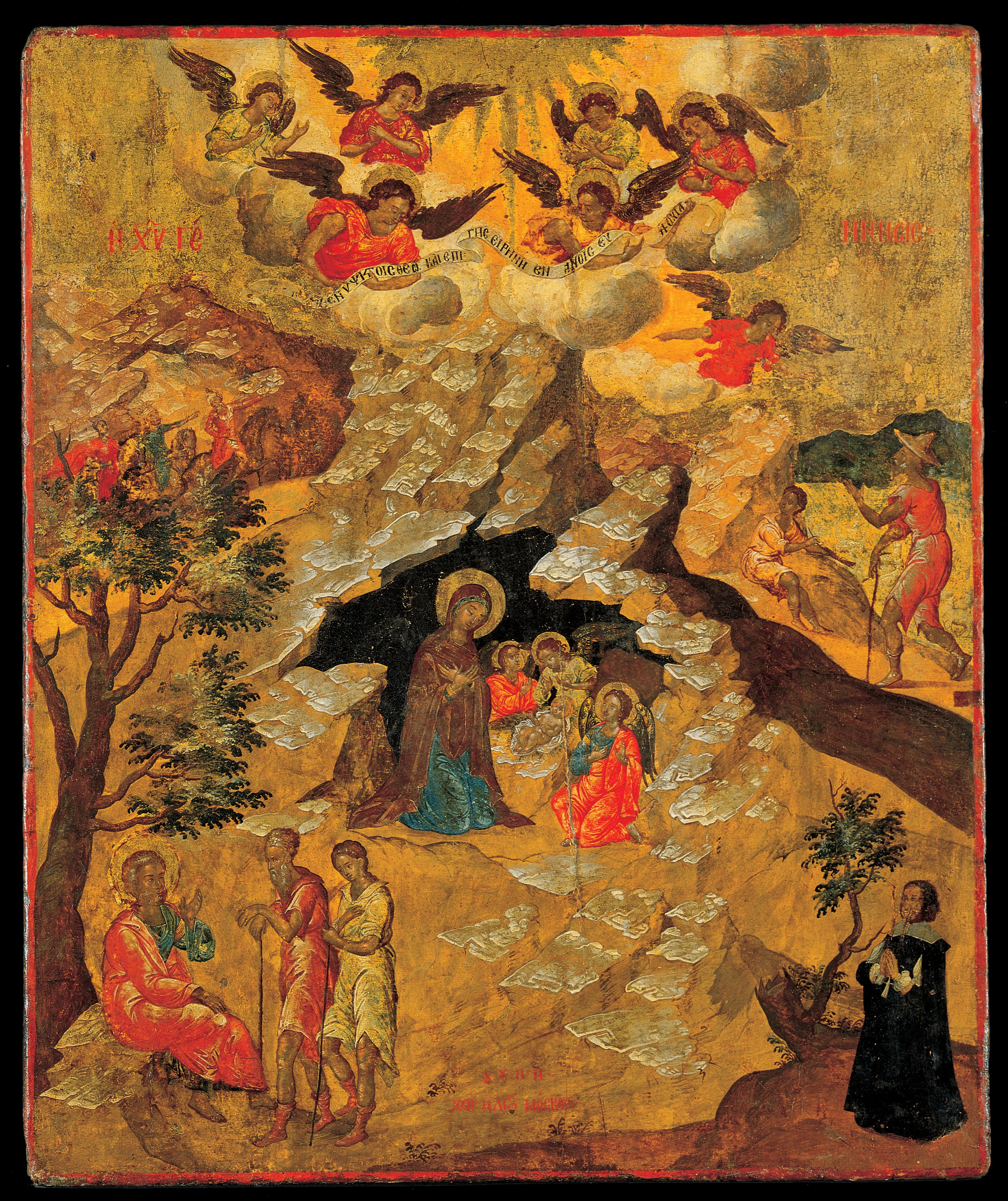
The Nativity

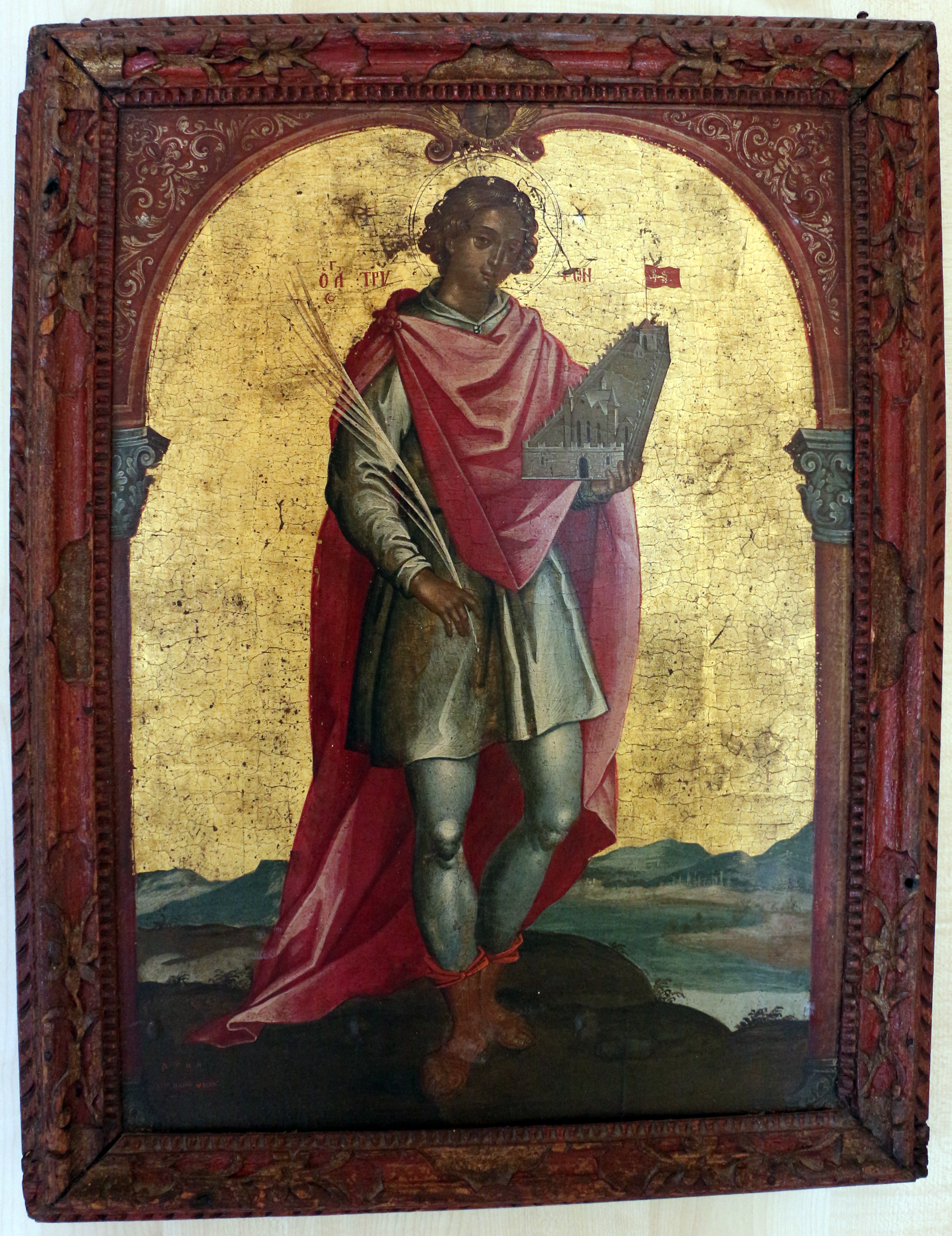
Saint 1658

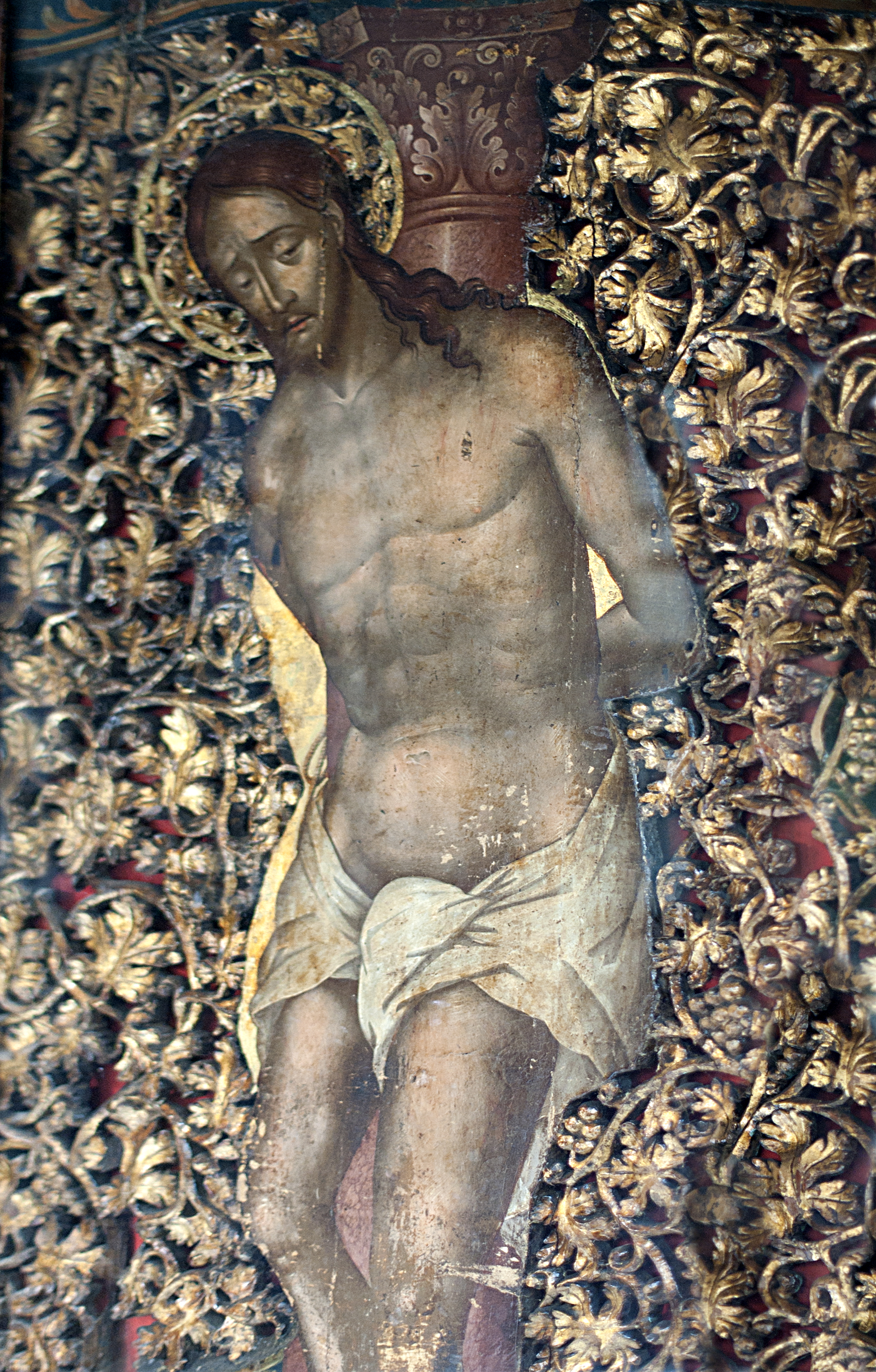
Jesus 1648

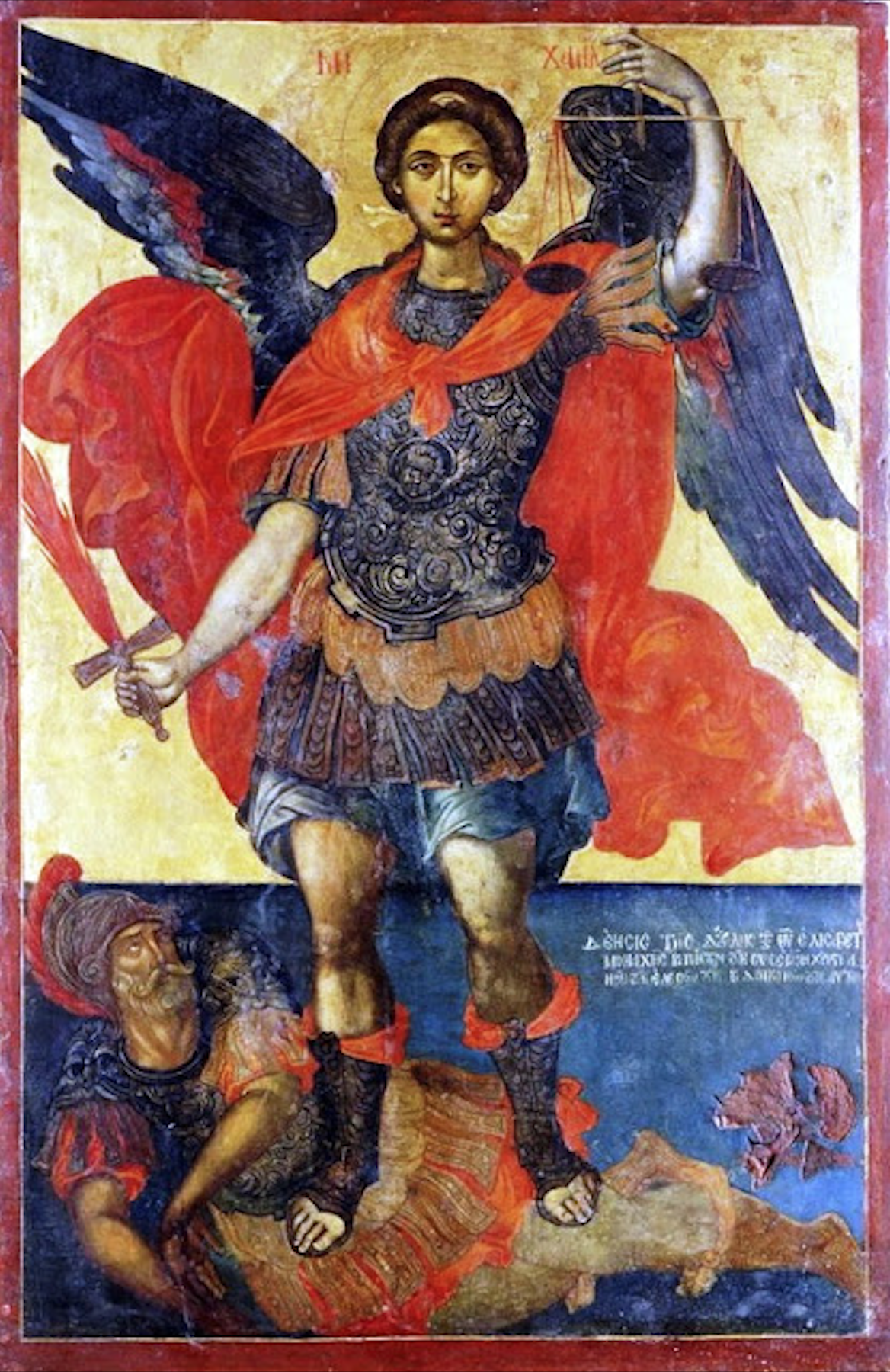
Archangel Michael Dionysios Loverdos Collection

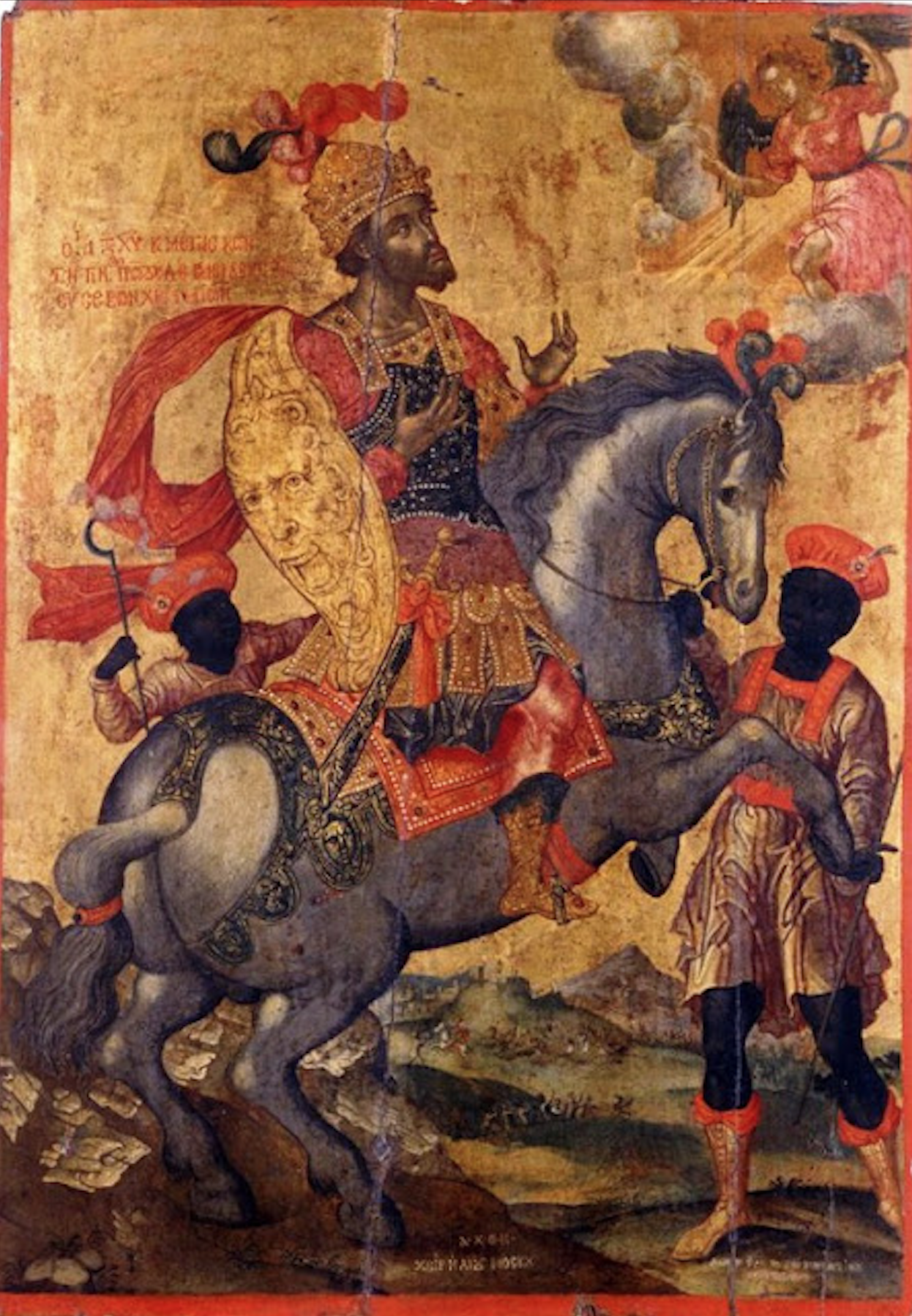
Saint Constantine 1678

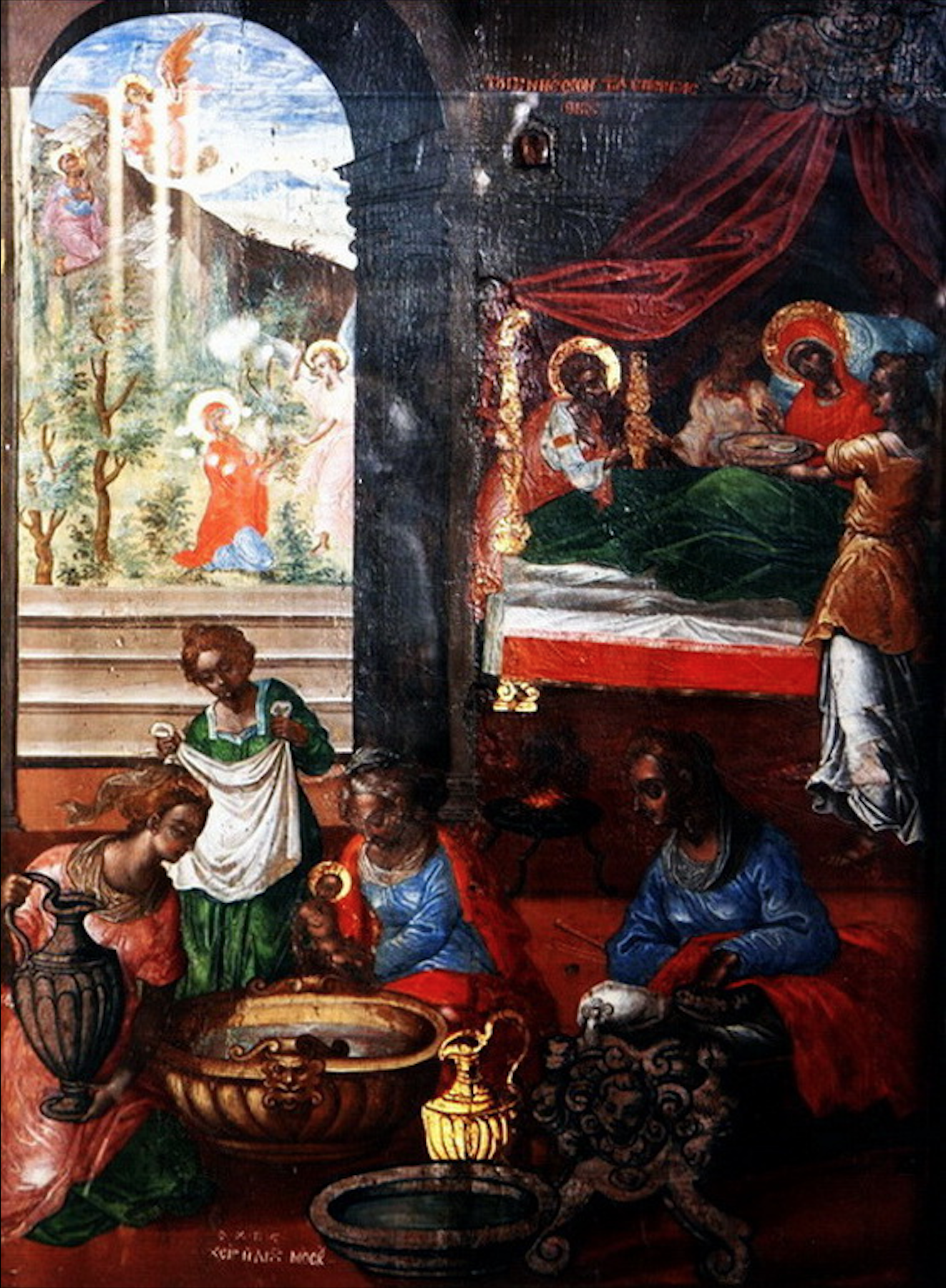
Birth of The Virgin Mary 1686

== Notable works ==
- Christ Enthroned (Moskos) 1653
- Birth of Jesus Christ 1658 Benaki Museum
- Burial of John the Evangelist 1653 Collection of Lichacev, Ermitage: Saint Petersburg, Russia
- Tryphon Donja Lastra, Boka Kotorska Dalmatia Croatia
- Icon of Jesus Museo Correr, Venice Italy
- The Vision of Constantine 1678
- Virgin and Child on Bronze (Moskos)
- Jacob’s Ladder (Moskos)
- The Dormition and Assumption of the Virgin

== See also ==
- Greek scholars in the Renaissance
- Iakovos Moskos
