= Virgin and Child (van der Weyden) =

Painting by Rogier van der Weyden

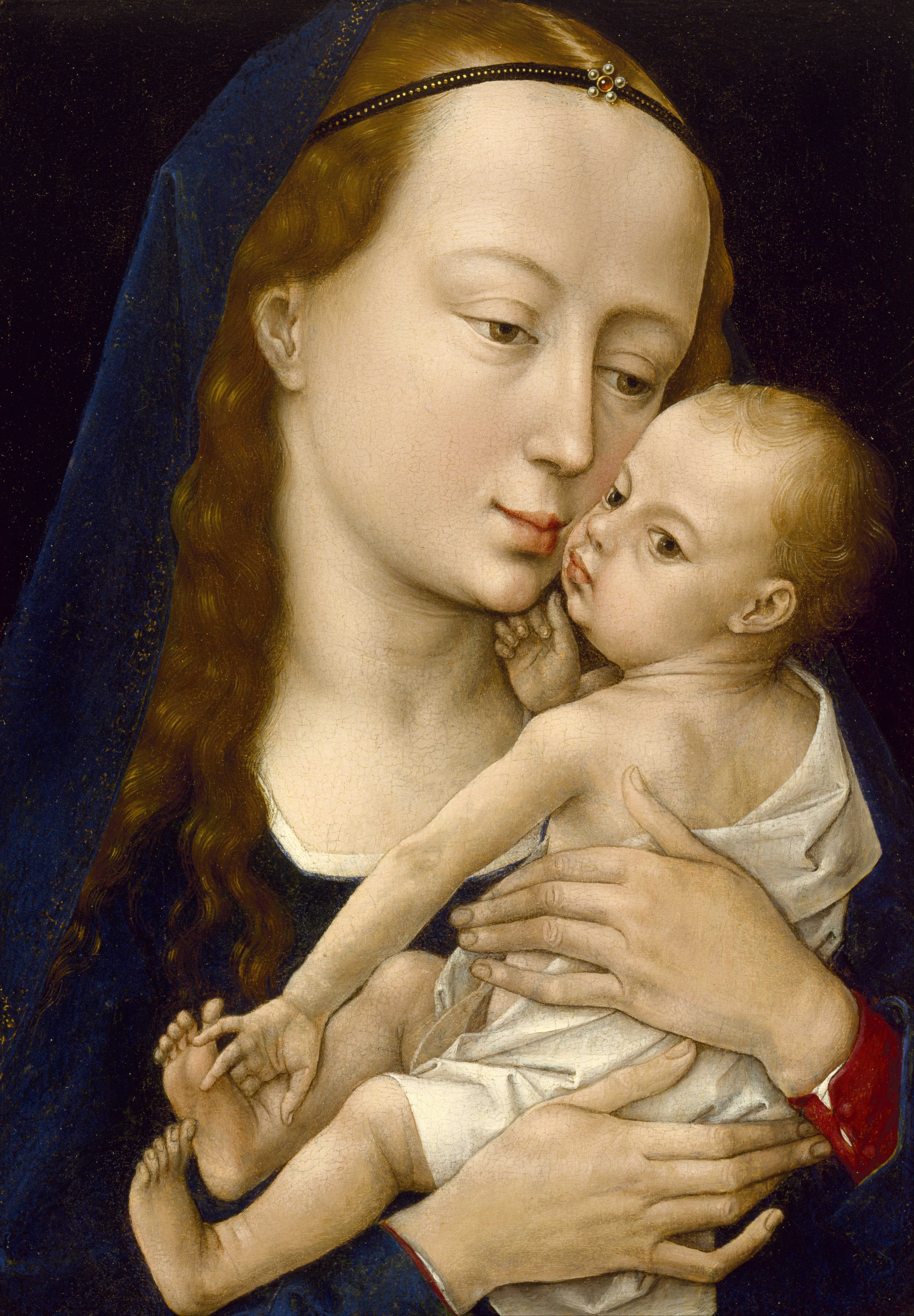
- Artist: Rogier van der Weyden
- Year: after 1454
- Type: Oil on oak panel
- Dimensions: 31.9 cm × 22.9 cm (12.6 in × 9.0 in)
- Location: Museum of Fine Arts, Houston
- Accession: 44.535
- Website: Museum page

The Virgin and Child is a painting by the Early Netherlandish artist Rogier van der Weyden dating from after 1454 in the collection of the Museum of Fine Arts, Houston.

It has not always been thought to be an original autograph work of van der Weyden. The noted art historian and specialist of the period Erwin Panofsky thought it merely an "excellent replica" of a design by van der Weyden, a view that seemed confirmed by the technical evidence available at the time. However more recent studies confirm it as an autograph.

== Description ==
The painting is probably the last of van der Weyden's half-length Madonnas, although rather smaller than the others. Half-length Madonnas had gone out of fashion in the Lowlands in the first half of the fifteenth century and it was van der Weyden who had reintroduced them.

In other respects it is quite atypical of the period. The tenderness of the embrace, the infant child anchored against the shoulder and twisting round (an example of contrapposto), and the pensive gaze of the Infant distinguish it from all its predecessors. It seems certain that van der Weyden's Madonna is based on the Italo-Byzantine Cambrai Madonna which had been brought back from Rome by a Cambrai monk in 1440 and installed with great ceremony in 1451 in the Cathédrale Notre-Dame de Grâce de Cambrai (the name itself derives from the image) at Cambrai some 30 miles to the south of Tournai where van der Weyden had grown up. This icon is of a kind known as an Eleusa icon (i.e.a tenderness icon) which are typified by the Infant nestling against the Virgin's cheek. A cult had grown up around it as painted by St. Luke himself, and copies were ordered from Hayne of Brussels as well as from Petrus Christus. But whereas Hayne at least had merely copied it, van der Weyden inventively transformed it. Panofsky believed he could date van der Weyden's painting after 1455 because that was the date the Saint John Altarpiece was commissioned by the Abbey of St. Aubert, Cambrai, delivered by him in person in 1459. However van der Weyden would have certainly have known of it otherwise, indeed had been commissioned as civic artist for Brussels to paint a Saint Luke Drawing the Virgin. Dekeyzer gives its date as circa 1460, and remarks it can be dated to the last years of van der Weyden's career on the basis of style, the broad forehead and narrow heavy-lidded eyes of the Virgin bearing a marked resemblance to the one in the Diptych of Philip de Croÿ with The Virgin and Child, which can be dated to 1460 on historical grounds.

== Gallery ==
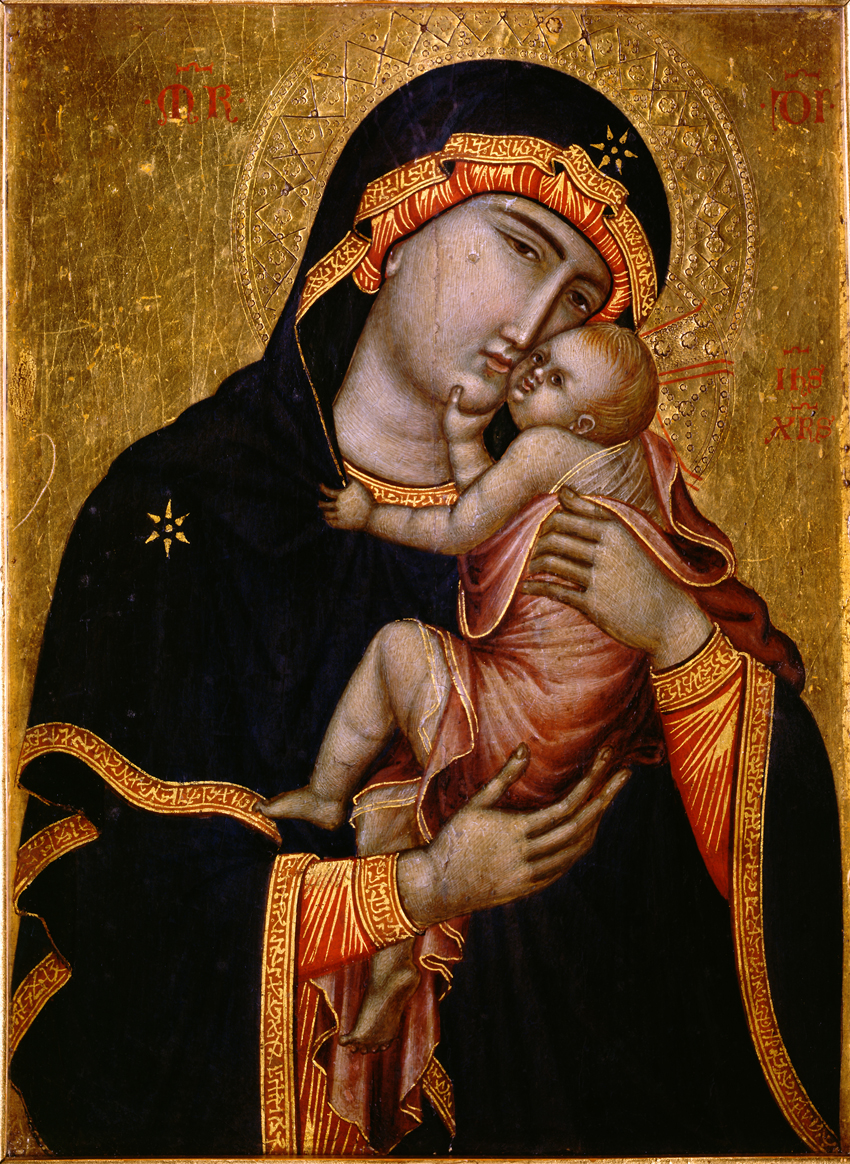
The Cambrai Madonna , (anonymous), c. 1340. Tempera on cedar panel. 35.7 cm x 25.7 cm. Cambrai Cathedral, France.

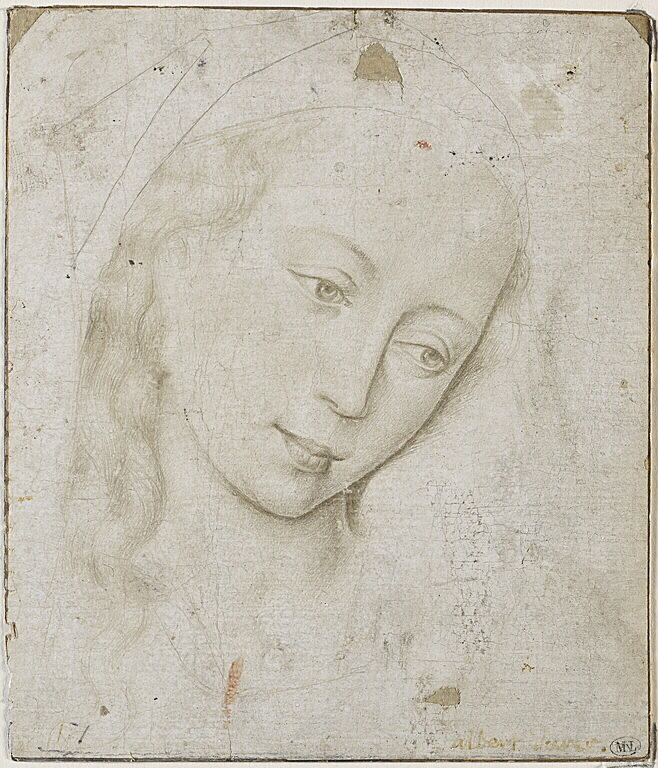
Rogier van der Weyden, Head of the Virgin, silverpoint on white prepared paper, Circa 1455-1464, Louvre, Paris. Friedrich Winkler and others think this was by van der Weyden himself, an attribution widely accepted today. At the bottom there is an inscription mistakenly attributing it to Albrecht Dürer.

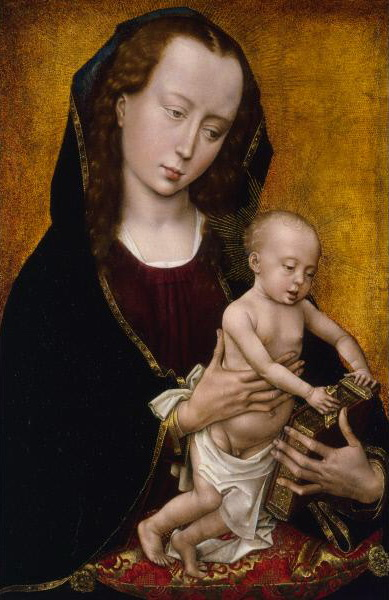
Virgin and Child (left wing of Rogier's Diptych of Philip de Croÿ with The Virgin and Child), oil on panel, circa 1460, Huntington Library, San Marino.

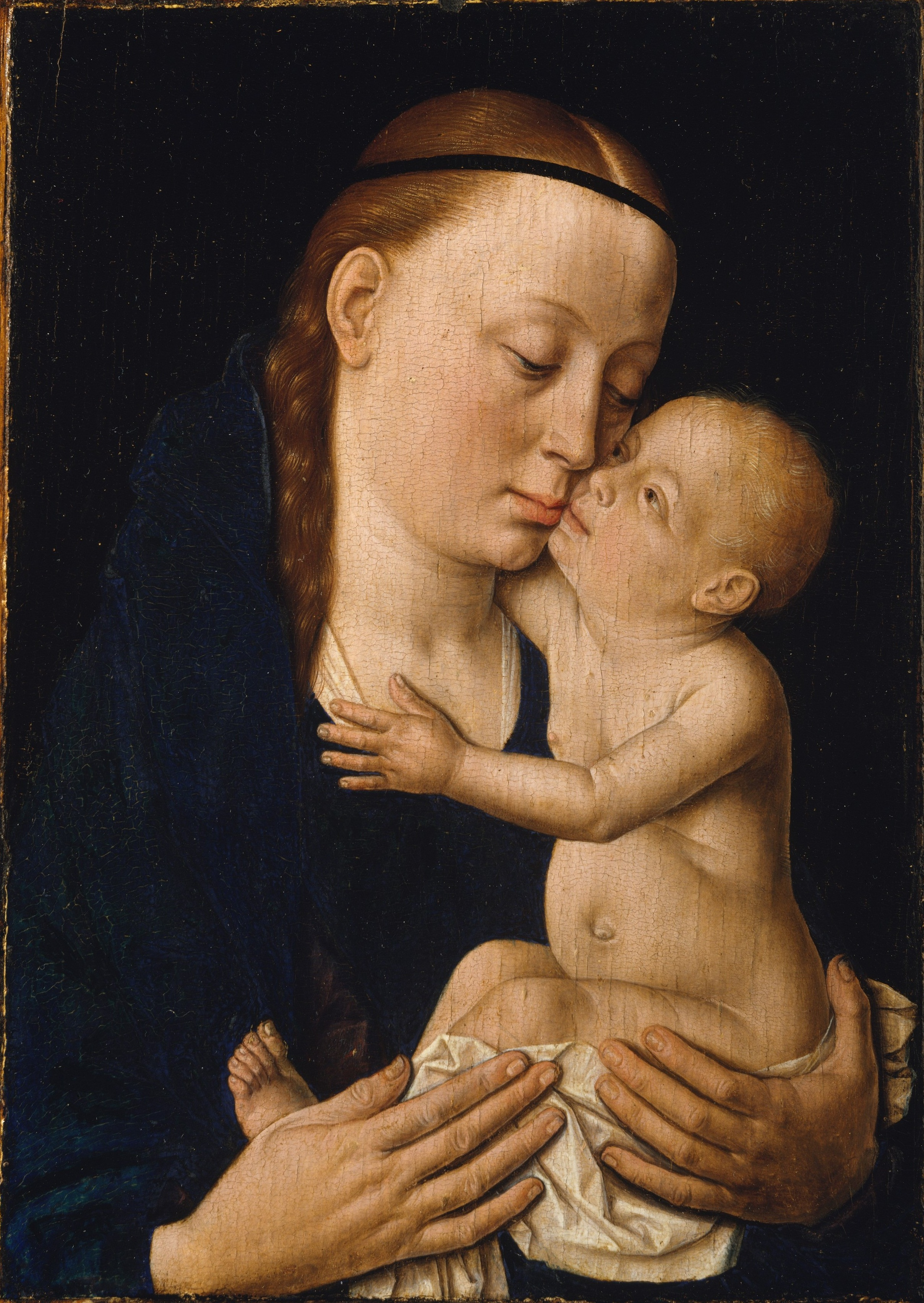
Dieric Bouts, Virgin and Child, oil on panel, circa 1455-1460. The Metropolitan Museum of Art.

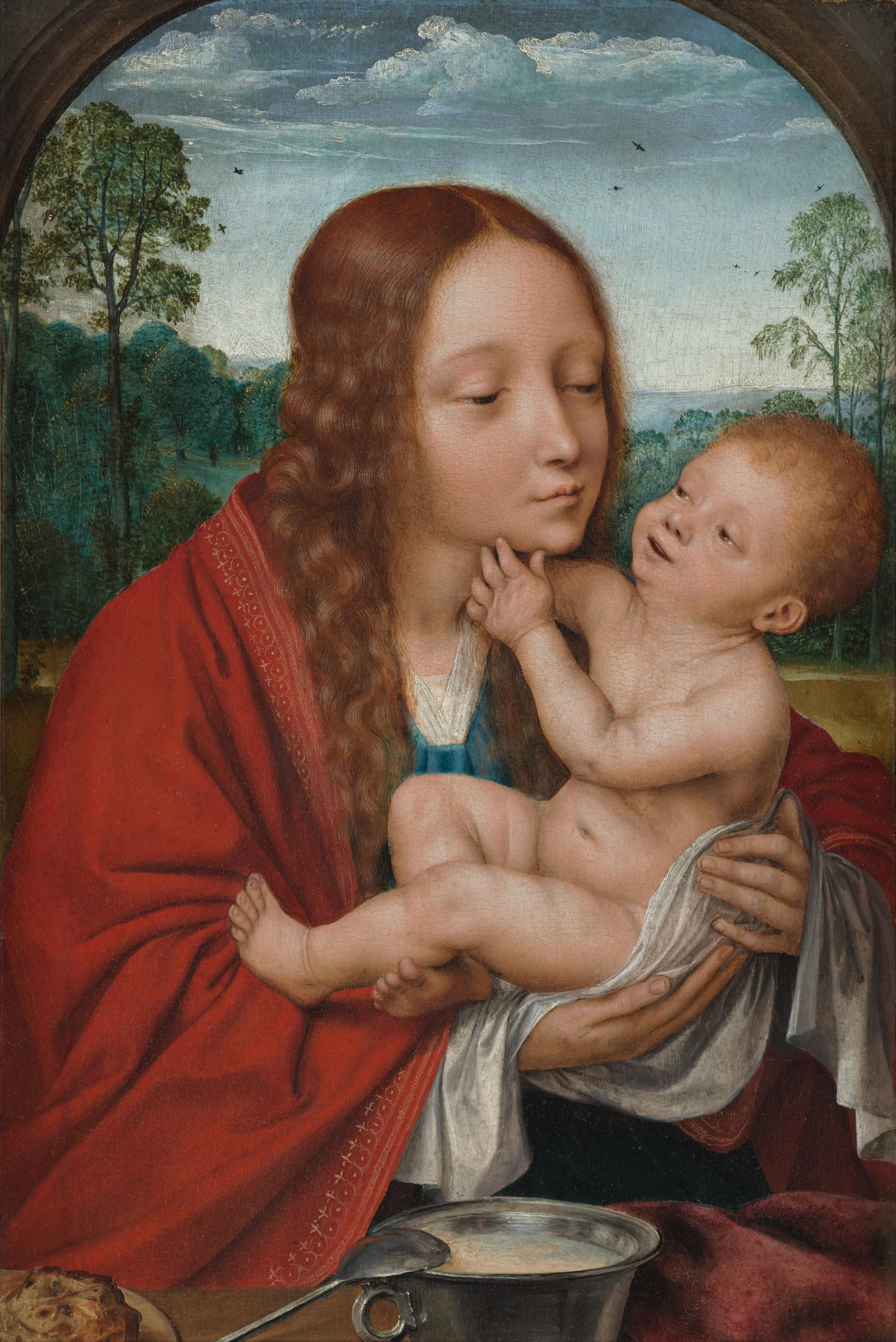
Quentin Matsys, Virgin and Child in a Landscape, oil on panel, circa 1520 Museum Boijmans Van Beuningen

== See also ==
- List of works by Rogier van der Weyden

== Bibliography ==
- Dekeyzer, Brigitte, The Virgin and Child in the Oeuver of Rogier van der Weyden in Campbell, Lorne and Van der Stock, Jan. (ed.) Rogier van der Weyden: 1400–1464. Master of Passions. Leuven: Davidsfonds, 2009. ISBN 978-90-8526-105-6, pp. 370–418
- Panofsky, Irwin. Early Netherlandish Painting: v. 1. Westview Press, 1971 (new edition). ISBN 978-0064300025
