= Master of the Magdalen =

Anonymous 13th c. Italian painter

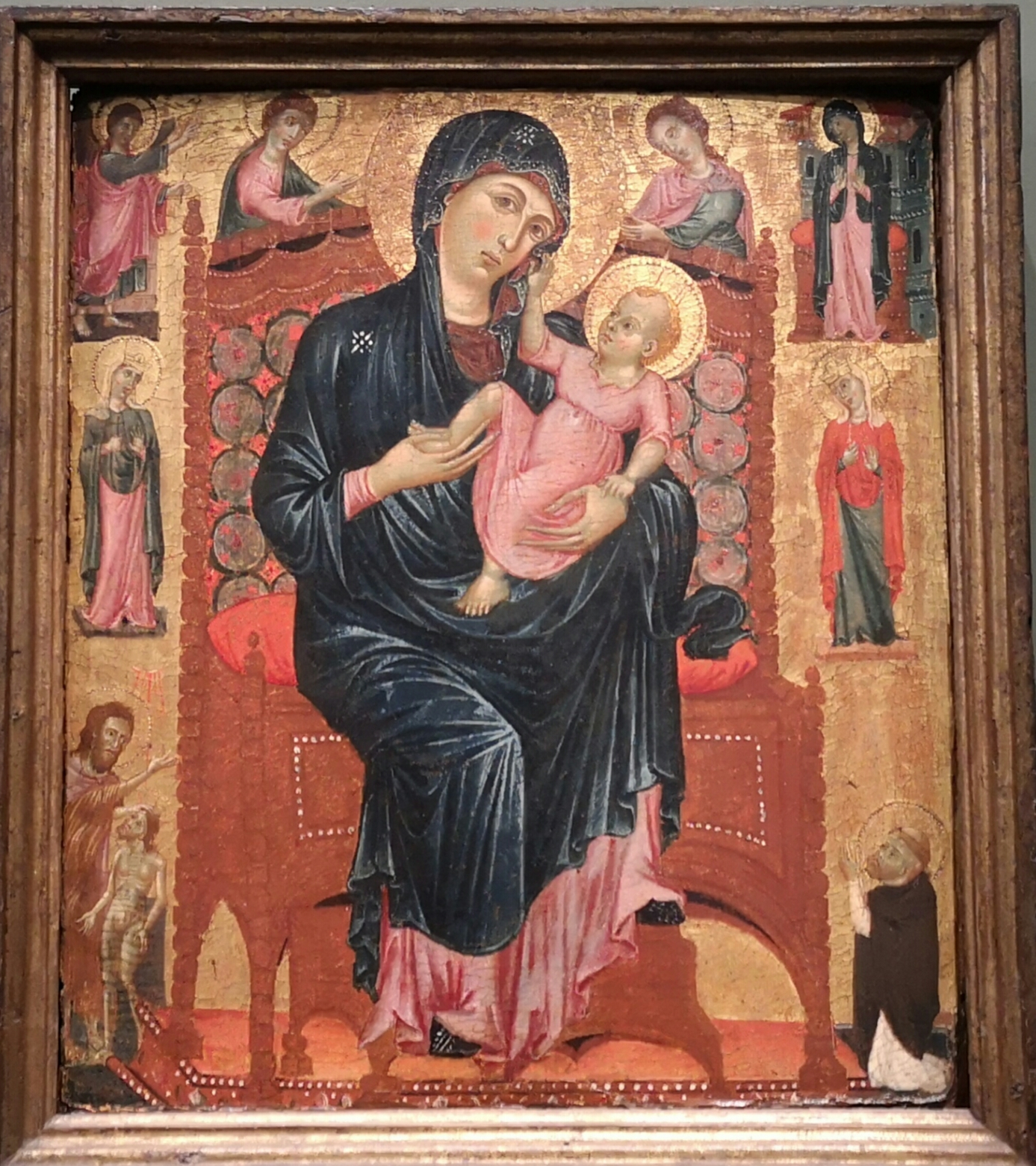
Madonna and Child, Alana Collection, Newark.

The Master of the Maddalena, Magdalen Master (and other variants) is an unnamed Florentine artist active in the second half of the 13th century. He is named after his best known work, Mary Magdalene with Eight Scenes from her Life. According to Miklos Boskovits, Grifo di Tancredi trained in this master's studio.

He is not to be confused with the much later Netherlandish Master of the Legend of the Magdalen.

His other works include

- Triptych of the Madonna with Scenes from the Life of Christ, c.1270, tempera and gold on panel, 40,6x56,6 cm, Metropolitan Museum of Art, New York
- St Luke, c.1280-1285, tempera and gold on panel, 132x50 cm, Galleria degli Uffizi, Florence
- Enthroned Madonna and Child, c.1280-1290, San Fedele church, Poppi
- Fragment of a Madonna and Child, Metropolitan Museum of Art, New York
- Designs for some of the mosaics of the Florence Baptistery

== Bibliography ==
- Boskovits, Miklós, Labriola, Ada, & Tartuferi, Angelo, The Origins of Florentine Painting, 1100-1270, Volume 1, 1993, Giunti, google books
- Mario Scalini (editor), L'arte a Firenze nell'età di Dante (1250-1300), Firenze, Giunti Editore, 2004. ISBN 8809036956 (online)
