= Grifo =

Grifo may refer to:

== People ==
- Grifo (noble) (726–753), Frankish noble
- Grifo di Tancredi (active 1271–1312), Italian painter
- Leonardo Grifo (died 1485), Roman Catholic prelate and Archbishop of Benevento
- Lionello Grifo (born 1934), Italian poet and writer
- Vincenzo Grifo (born 1993), Italian-German footballer

== Other uses ==
- Teichfuss Grifo, an Italian training glider
- Ambrosini S.1001 Grifo, an Italian light airplane
- Iso Grifo, an Italian grand tourer automobile
