= Lionello =

Lionello is a given name. Notable people with the name include:

Given name:

- Lionello Bononi, Italian of the Baroque period
- Lionello Cecil (1893–1957), Australian operatic tenor
- Lionello d'Este (1407–1450), marquis of Ferrara and Duke of Modena and Reggio Emilia from 1441 to 1450
- Lionello Grifo (born 1934), Italian poet and writer
- Lionello Levi Sandri (1910–1991), Italian politician and European Commissioner
- Lionello Manfredonia (born 1956), Italian former footballer
- Lionello Spada (1576–1622), Italian painter of the Baroque period

Surname:

- Alberto Lionello (1930–1994), Italian film actor
- Luca Lionello (born 1964), Italian actor
- Oreste Lionello (1927–2009), Italian actor and voice dubbing artist
