= The Magdalen Weeping =

Painting by the workshop of Master of the Legend of the Magdalen

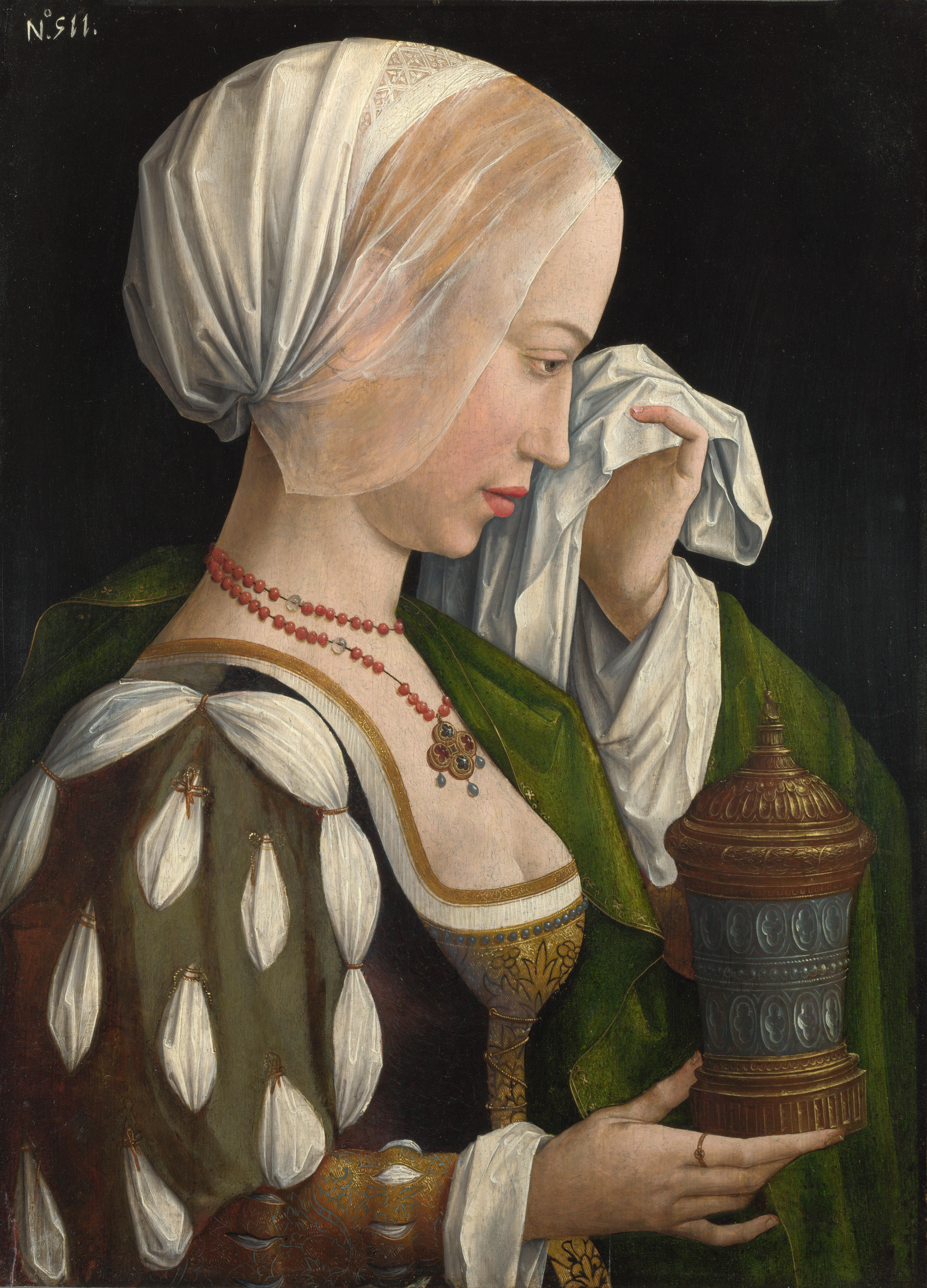
The Magdalen Weeping, c 1525. 52 x 34.9 cm

The Magdalen Weeping is an oil on oak panel painting attributed to the workshop of the unidentified Early Netherlandish artist known today by the notname the Master of the Legend of the Magdalen, active in Brussels. Although beautiful, the painting is significantly damaged and has been restored and overpainted a number of times since the 19th century; not always successfully and the impact of the image is considered to have been lessened as a result. It is held in the National Gallery, in London.

It has been cut down both in width and height, although given that the background is flat and featureless, no significant detail is thought to have been lost.

== Attribution and dating ==
Because so little is known about the artist, dating his work or that attributed to his workshop is extremely difficult. This panel is thought to have been completed in the mid-1500s, based on the fashion of the woman's dress, which is comparable the female figure in Joos van Cleve's 1524 Lamentation triptych. The work's provenance extends to Venice and Madrid in the 1800s, and it has been kept in the National Gallery, London since donated by the estate of Lady Layard in 1916. Some aspects of the joinery of the oak panel support suggest that it was created as the left wing of a lost triptych, but no works that fit as the central and right hand panels have emerged.

== Description ==
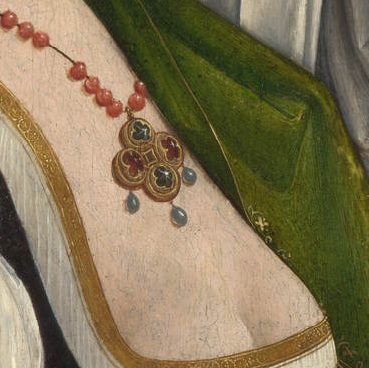
Detail showing the pendant of glass beads strung on cord culminating in point-cut diamonds and rubies. Although the work is pious, its sensuality, seen here in the lace opening of the underdress, indicates the new freedom available to some well-patronised artists of the early 16th century.

The woman can be identified as Mary Magdalen from the jar of oil held in her hand; her traditional attribute in 15th and 16th century northern European art. The jar, depicted in fine detail, appears to be made from a precious blue stone mounted in gold. Magdalen is depicted with brown eyes and shallow pale skin, and is dressed in finely embroidered clothes, which some interpret as alluding to her sinful past. She wears a white cap over her strawberry-blond hair. The cap is covered by two white veils; one semi-transparent, the other opaque white. Infra-red photography reveals a number of preparatory underdrawings. Samples of the pigments show that three different purples were used; formed from mixtures of lead white, azurite and red lake, however most passages of purple have either faded or been overpainted by restorers.

She wears a green overcoat, previously painted purple. Her underdress is laced and reveals the upper portion of her chest. A rosary wraps around her long neck, with beads that seem to be formed from glass and are strung on brown cord. She holds a white cloth to her eye to wipe away tears, presumably those of repentance.

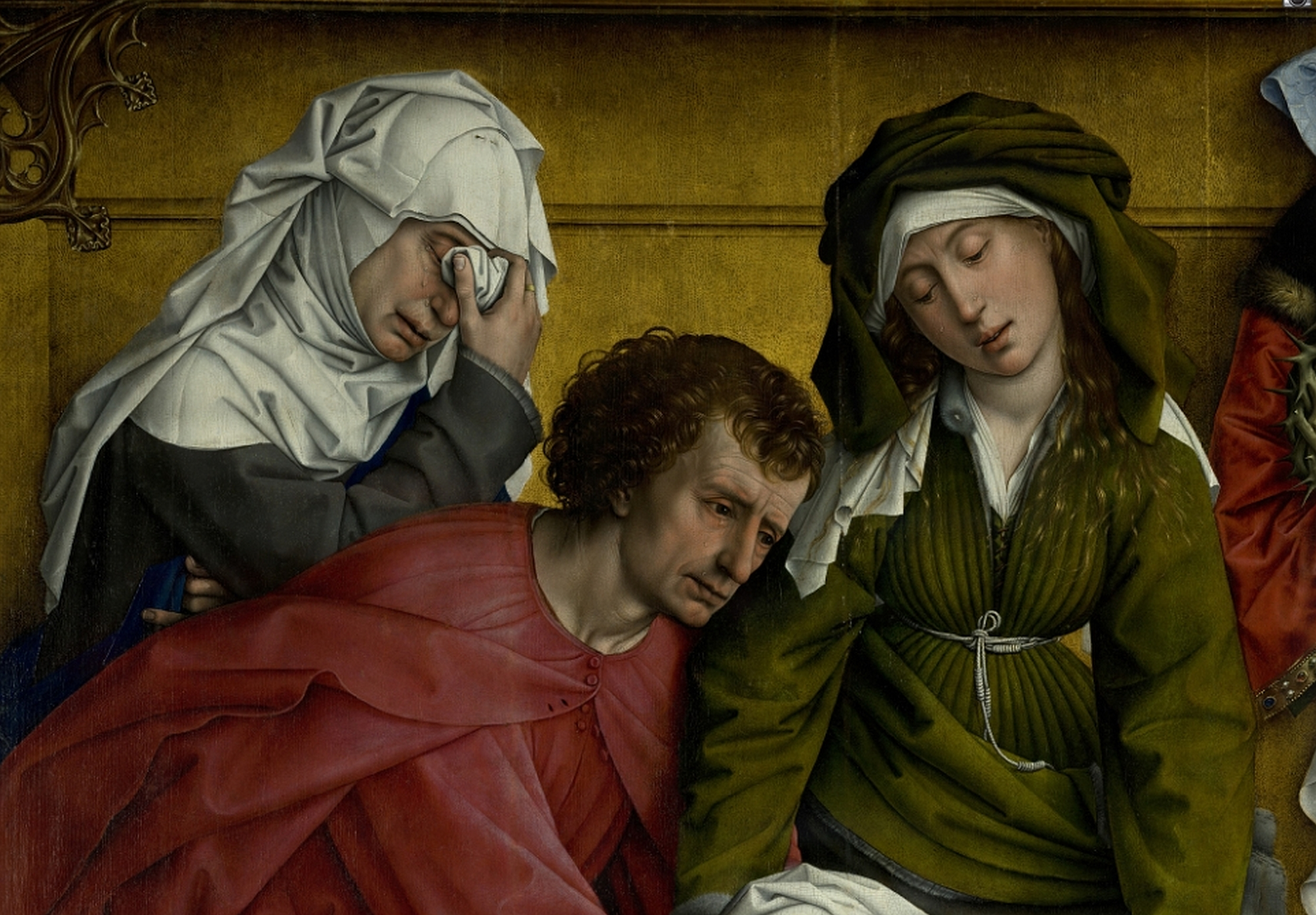
Detail from van der Weyden's c. 1435 Descent.

The cloth held to her face is heavily folded and linear in a manner reminiscent of the style of Rogier van der Weyden, by whom the artist is believed to have been influenced. The painting was in fact at one point in the 19th century attributed to van der Weyden. However, the painting contains a number of anatomical flaws not usually associated with a van der Weyden; the woman's ear is far too large; her forehead unusually flat, the chin recedes and her eye is too close to the center. While the curves of her cleavage are well described the lower sections of her bust appear not to exist. The oak frame is not especially well-made, another reason why the painting is generally attributed to the Master's workshop rather than to he himself.

The woman is delicately portrayed and the use of colour has been described as at the highest level of painterly skill. Her gown, veil and cleavage have moralistic undertones as reminders of her sinful past. At the same time, the image is clearly intended to be sensual, a reflection of the new confidence and daring allowed to artists of the early 16th century.

== Sources ==
The painting's sources can be easily derived; it shares the emotional impact and broad colourisation of Rogier van der Weyden, while the representation of female crying face in European art of this period began with Robert Campin and was extended and developed by van der Weyden and Hugo van der Goes. Although the comparable passages in the works by these earlier artists are more technically proficient, the sensual daring of the 1520s panel far exceeds what might have been deemed acceptable in female representation in the mid-15th century.

== Sources ==
- Campbell, Lorne. The Fifteenth Century Netherlandish Schools. London: National Gallery Publications, 1998. ISBN 1-85709-171-X
- Levey, Michael. The National Gallery, London. London: Thames and Hudson, 1977.
