= Mary Magdalene with Eight Scenes from her Life =

Painting by the Master of the Magdalen

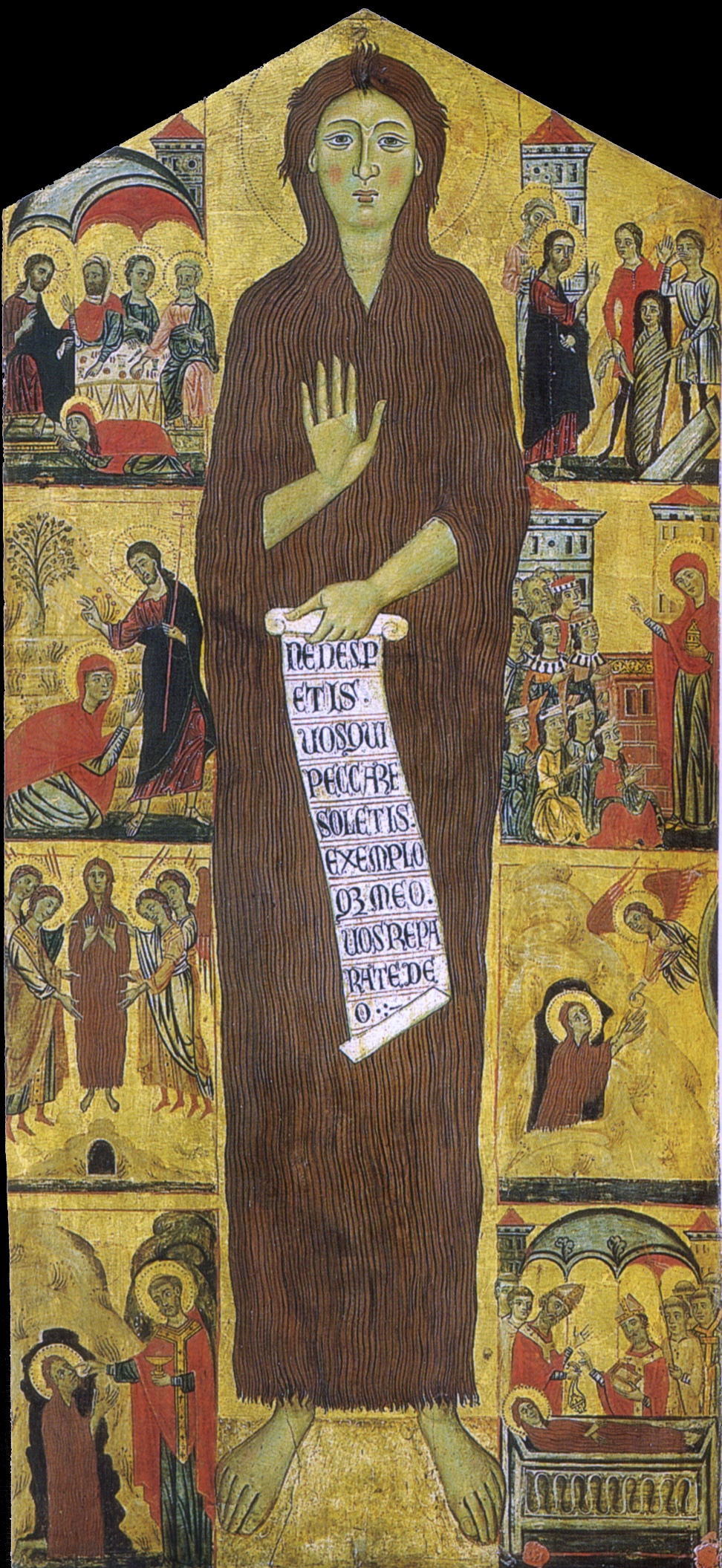

Mary Magdalene with Eight Scenes from her Life is a c.1280-1285 tempera and gold on panel painting by the Master of the Magdalen, now in the Galleria dell'Accademia in Florence.

== History ==
Its original provenance is unknown, but it was mentioned as being in the vestibule of the monastery library at Santissima Annunziata in guidebooks by Follini-Rastrelli and Moreni, as part of a group of works within the collection of Francesco Raimondo Adami, Vicar General of the Ordine dei Servi di Maria. When the religious houses were suppressed in 1810 the painting moved to its present home, where it has been exhibited since 1817

== Central Figure ==
This work portrays Mary Magdalene draped in hair, with a halo around her head to symbolize her sainthood. She holds a scroll which reads in Latin, "Do not despair those of you who are accustomed to sin, and in keeping with my example, return yourselves to God."

== Side scenes ==
=== Left column ===
Top to bottom:

- Mary Magdalene Anointing Christ's Feet
- Noli Me Tangere
- Mary Magdalene Borne to Heaven by Angels
- Mary Magdalene's Last Communion

=== Right column ===
Top to bottom:

- Resurrection of Lazarus
- Mary Magdalene Preaching
- An Angel Feeding Mary Magdalene in the Desert
- Funeral of Mary Magdalene

== Bibliography (in Italian) ==
- G. Bonsanti, La galleria dell'Accademia, Firenze. Guida e catalogo completo, Firenze, 1990.
- AA.VV., Galleria dell'Accademia, Giunti, Firenze 1999. ISBN 88-09-04880-6
- Franca Falletti, Marcella Anglani, Galleria dell'Accademia. Guida ufficiale, Firenze, Giunti Editore, 1999. ISBN 8809013433 (online)
