= Italo-Byzantine =

Style term in art history

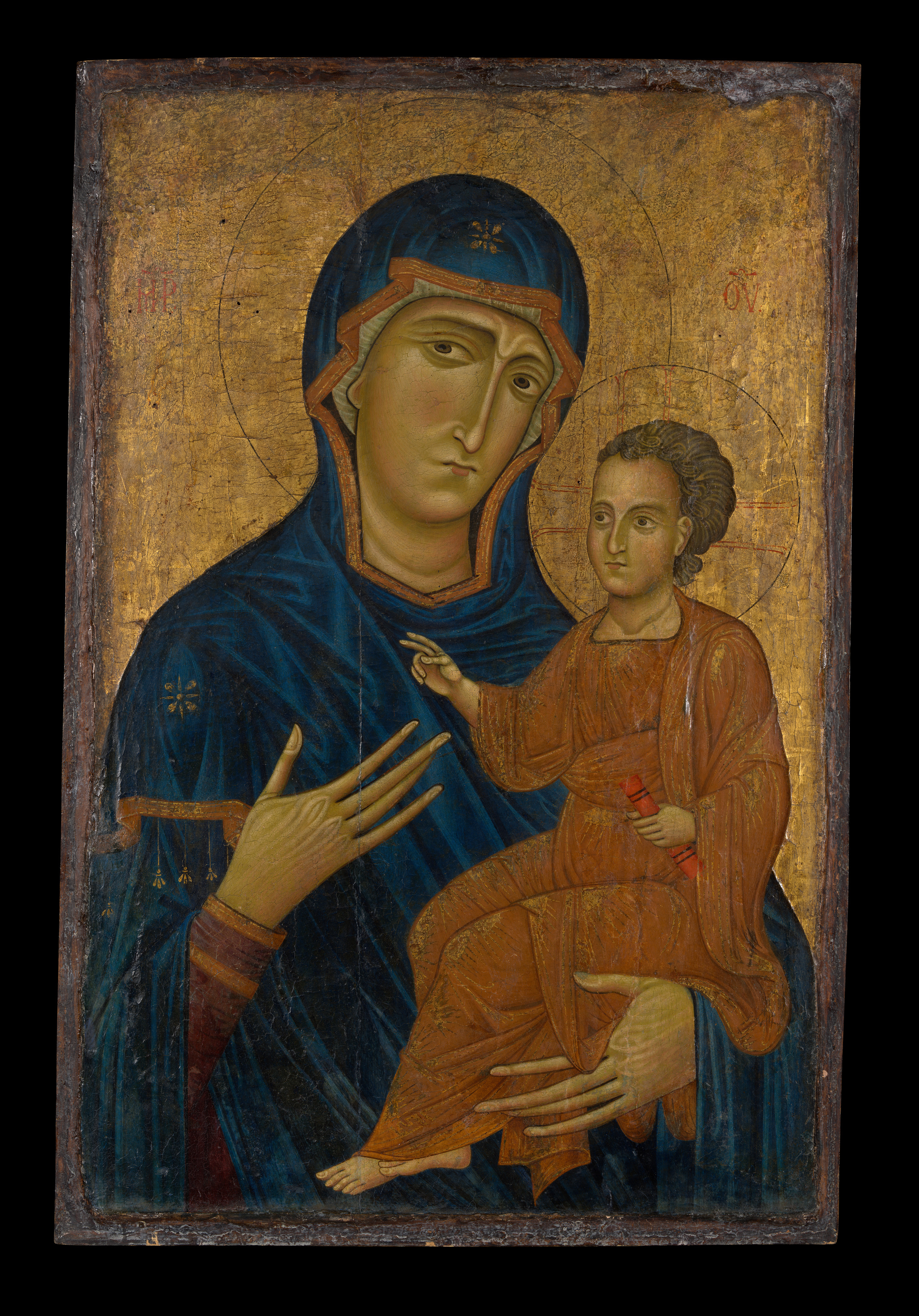
Madonna and Child, Berlinghiero, c. 1230, tempera on wood, with gold ground, Metropolitan Museum of Art.

Italo-Byzantine is a style term in art history, mostly used for medieval paintings produced in Italy under heavy influence from Byzantine art. It initially covers religious paintings copying or imitating the standard Byzantine icon types, but painted by artists without a training in Byzantine techniques. These are versions of Byzantine icons, most of the Madonna and Child, but also of other subjects; essentially they introduced the relatively small portable painting with a frame to Western Europe. Very often they are on a gold ground. It was the dominant style in Italian painting until the end of the 13th century, when Cimabue and Giotto began to take Italian, or at least Florentine, painting into new territory. But the style continued until the 15th century and beyond in some areas and contexts.

Maniera greca ("Greek style/manner") was the Italian term used at the time, and by Vasari and others; it is one of the first post-classical European terms for style in art. Vasari was no admirer, defining the Renaissance as a rejection of "that clumsy Greek style" ("quella greca goffa maniera"); other Renaissance writers were similarly critical.

This also covered actual Byzantine icons in Italy; by the Renaissance these were imported on a large scale from Crete, then a Venetian possession. Especially in later periods, the terms also cover paintings done in Italy by Greek or Greek-trained artists; some of these are difficult to distinguish from works of the Cretan School, the main source of Greek imports to Europe. In the mid-20th century, many of these were attributed to Venetian Dalmatia, which is now less popular among scholars. Veneto-Cretan is a modern term for such paintings.

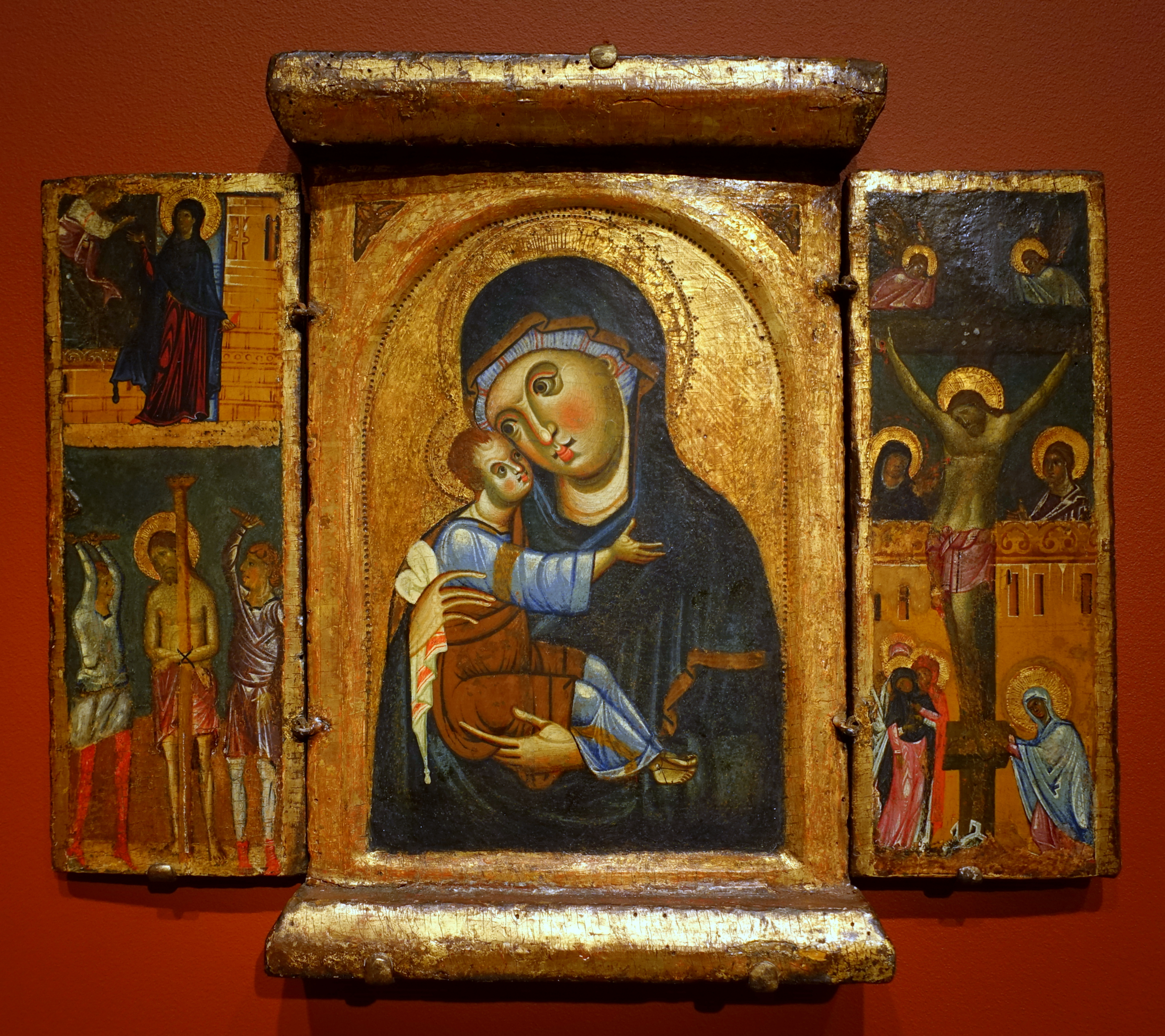
Madonna and Child, with Annunciation, Flagellation & Crucifixion, mid-13th century

According to John Steer, "down to the thirteenth century ... all Italian local schools [of painting] were provincial variants of the central Byzantine tradition". Most of the artists of Italo-Byzantine paintings are unknown, though we know some facts about later transitional figures such as Coppo di Marcovaldo in Florence (active mid-13th century), and Berlinghiero of Lucca (active c. 1228–42). The gold ground style encouraged strong outlines in the painted shapes, and "figures are formed out of abstract but expressive shapes designed to identify various body parts or items of clothing while creating beautiful patterns."

== Terms and scope ==
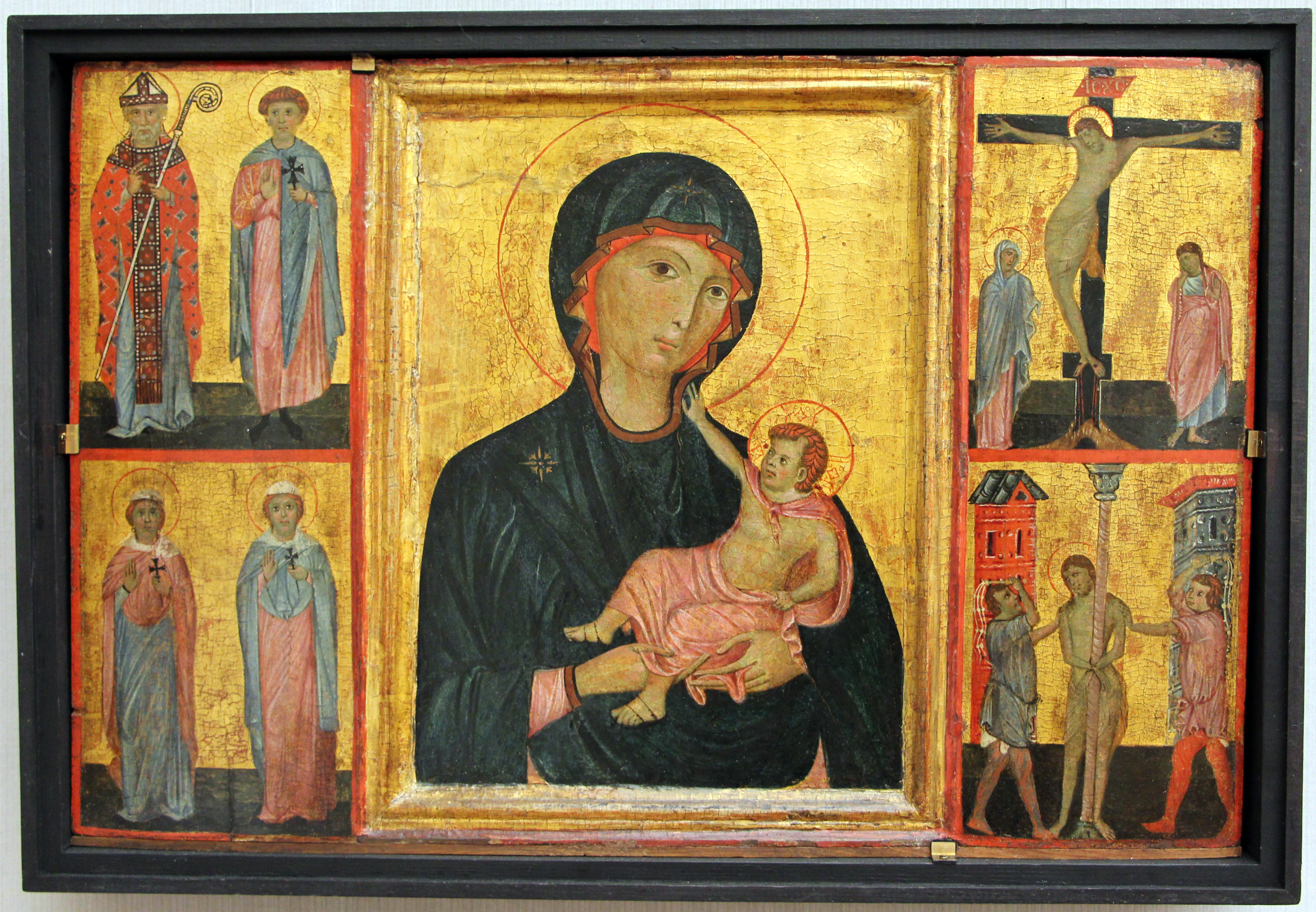
Late 13th-century triptych, probably by Grifo di Tancredi

The term "Italo-Byzantine" is used for sculpture much less often, as the Byzantines did not provide large models to follow for that. It may be used of ivories, mosaics and the like. In architecture it is the almost inevitable term used for San Marco, Venice, and a few other very old buildings in Venice (the Fondaco dei Turchi for example) and on the small islands of Torcello (Torcello Cathedral) and Murano in the lagoon, but is not often used for other buildings (until 19th-century revivals such as Westminster Cathedral and Bristol Byzantine). Even the rest of Venetian Gothic architecture does not owe much to Byzantium.

The people of the parts of southern Italy and Sicily ruled by the Byzantines during the High Middle Ages often continued to speak Greek until about the 16th century and had Greek Orthodox religious habits. They and things relating to them may be called Italo-Byzantine, or alternatively "Italo-Greek" or "Italo-Albanian". The Eastern Catholic Italo-Byzantine or Italo-Albanian Catholic Church was set up to enable them to keep Orthodox traditions within the Catholic Church; it now has some 70,000 members, not all in Italy.

Variants of maniera greca in contemporary sources such as inventories included alla greca, more greco, grechescha and pittura greca, as well as ones using "Cretan" or "Candia", the Venetian name for Heraklion, then as now the main city on Crete. These included quadro a la candiota and quadro candiota piccolo ("a small Candia picture"); they are probably best regarded as a characterization by style rather than a record of the place of origin. Especially for Venetian paintings, modern art history may use local terms such as scuola veneto-bizantina ("Venetian-Byzantine school") or "Byzantine (Greco-Venetian) School", especially in Italian.

=== Baroque sculpture ===
Maniera greca had a different meaning from the 17th century, when it described a trend in Baroque sculpture especially associated with Francois Duquesnoy, a Flemish sculptor working in Rome and his pupils such as Rombaut Pauwels. Duquesnoy's Saint Susanna (1633) in Santa Maria di Loreto, Rome is an example. At the time even artists in Rome were able to see very little actual ancient Greek sculpture, and their idea of "Greekness" is rather subtle and hard to reconstruct today; to a large degree it relates to Hellenistic sculpture rather than that of earlier periods, and gives a more restrained and less dramatic style of Baroque than that of, say, Bernini.

== History ==
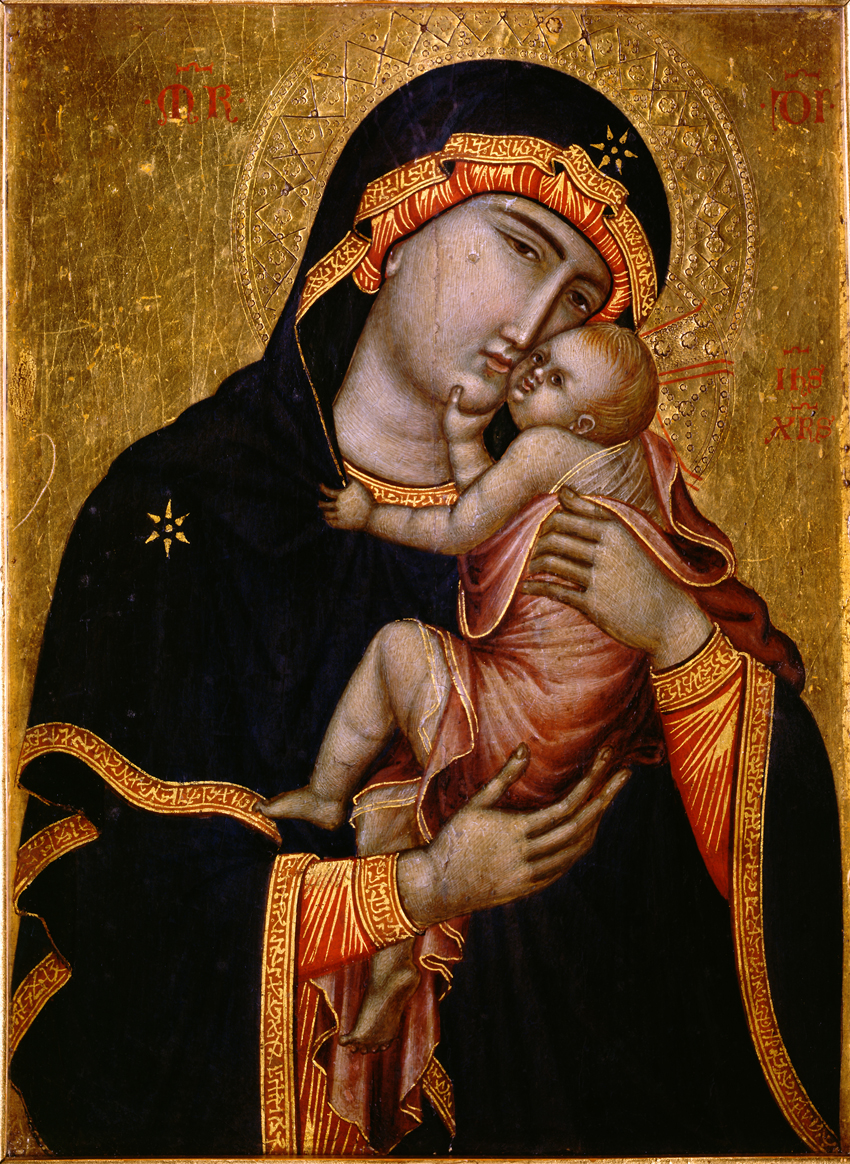
The Cambrai Madonna, Italian, c. 1340. Tempera on cedar panel. 35.7 cm x 25.7 cm. Now Cambrai Cathedral, France.

The Italo-Byzantine icon style is usually said to have become common after the Sack of Constantinople in 1204 by the Fourth Crusade. The booty brought back to Europe included many icons, which probably stimulated demand for more, and provided models for local artists. The portable panel painting was not a usual form in the West before this, though a few Byzantine examples had arrived, and were often highly revered, and a few had been locally produced, like the possibly 7th-century Madonna della Clemenza. The 13th century also saw a great increase in devotions to the Virgin Mary, led by the Franciscan Order, founded five years after the sack. At this point most examples were probably made for churches, or for great households; these tended to be left to churches later.

The reasons and forces that led to the development of altarpieces are not generally agreed upon. Placing decorated reliquaries of saints on or behind the altar, as well as the tradition of decorating the front of the altar with sculptures or textiles, preceded the first altarpieces. During the 13th century, liturgical changes (only reversed in the 20th century) placed the priest celebrating mass on the same side of the altar as the congregation, so with his back to them for much of the time. This encouraged the creation of altarpieces behind and above the altar were a visual devotional focus. Most larger Italo-Byzantine paintings were altarpieces, for which the elaborately framed polyptych or "composite altarpiece" form soon developed. These were especially common in Venice, where large mural schemes in fresco were rare; mosaic was greatly preferred, but too expensive for most churches. Paolo Veneziano (active roughly from 1321 to 1360) led the development, with a style that is "still Byzantine", but increasingly influenced by the Gothic art developing north of the Alps, and personal elements. However, influence from Giotto is "almost entirely absent".

In the later part of the 13th century the two leading painters in north Italy, Cimabue in Florence (active c. 1270–1303) and Duccio in Siena (active c. 1268–1311) were both trained and highly skilled in the Italo-Byzantine style, but also developing it in new directions in terms of representing solidity and depth, and loosening up the age-old Byzantine poses. This approach, and its further development by Giotto, was slowly taken up by the main workshops in other cities, but many lesser figures in smaller or more remote cities and towns continued the old style for a considerable time.

The Cambrai Madonna is a relatively late piece, probably painted around 1340 in Italy, perhaps in Pisa, by no means entirely in the old Italo-Byzantine style. One Greek scholar describes it as "a work which most likely no Byzantine of the period would have recognized as a Greek icon". It is especially significant because by the time a canon of Cambrai Cathedral bought it for the cathedral in 1450 it was believed to be the original portrait of the Virgin Mary painted by Saint Luke the Evangelist and was much copied by Early Netherlandish painters. Some copies are clearly Netherlandish in style, though preserving the pose and details of the original, but others previously thought to have been made in Italy may in fact have been made in the Netherlands by local artists.

The maniera greca survived being replaced by the top Italian painters, indeed became more common, as increasing prosperity and cheap Cretan imports spread the possibility of owning an icon for the home down the economic scale. By the 16th century, as revealed by inventories, ownership of alla greca icons was highly common in noble households, and those of the senior clergy, and was spreading to the homes of the middle classes, and later the working classes.

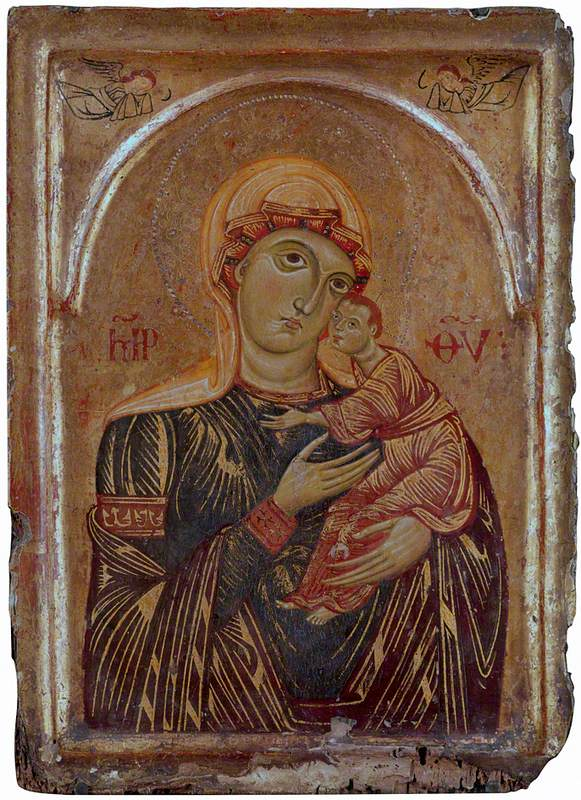
1260s, from Pisa, stolen from the National Gallery

By 1615, one study showed that a remarkable 81% of the households of Venetian labourers possessed artworks of some sort; when icons, these would have mostly have been very small, and perhaps mostly Cretan imports (see below). However, by this period alla greca icons had come to seem old-fashioned, although some lingered until the 18th century. The Cretan icon-industry was already adopting more up to date Western styles, with some success, and the slow loss of Crete to the Ottomans from 1645 to 1669 seriously interrupted supplies.

As the gap in style between contemporary Italian painting and Italo-Byzantine (or Greek post-Byzantine) icons grew wider, there is evidence that at least some Italians regarded the maniera greca as superior from a devotional point of view. This was partly because of the perceived authenticity of the compositions or poses of Byzantine icons, which were believed, and proclaimed by the Orthodox, to have remained unchanged since the very beginning of Christianity, and in several cases to derive either from miraculous acheiropoieta or "icons not made by human hands", or from supposed portrait paintings of Christ or the Virgin painted from the life, by Saint Luke or others. Some, especially among the clergy, felt that the beauty and greater naturalism of newer Italian styles distracted from devotion.

The Greek originals received a late boost in popularity in the decades after the Fall of Constantinople in 1453 brought a new influx of Greeks and icons to Italy. Prominent collectors included Pope Paul II (d. 1471), who by 1457 had 23 micromosaic icons and 13 painted or relief ones. Some later passed to Lorenzo de' Medici, who owned 11 mosaic icons at his death in 1492. The Greek Cardinal Bessarion gave several icons to Saint Peter's, Rome, and lent Greek manuscripts to Francesco d'Este to be copied; d'Este many have had some of Paul II's icons.

=== Western panel-painting before about 1200 ===
Italian painting up to about 1200 was used for illuminated manuscripts, frescos, and on wood, large painted crucifixes for rood crosses in churches, as well as assorted pieces of furniture and so on. The life-size crucifixes were not a Byzantine form, and were probably regarded in Italy as a cheaper version of the crosses with a sculpted corpus or body. Famous versions of the sculpted type include the Gero Cross (Cologne, 10th-century), the Holy Face of Lucca (originally 11th-century or earlier), and the 12th-century Catalan Batlló Majesty. The painted crucifixes typically included many smaller figures in sections at the four extremities of the cross, and built out to the sides below the horizontal arms, level with Christ's torso and legs, as in the cross in Sarzana Cathedral, dated 1138, the earliest dated Tuscan painting.

Of the painted versions the San Damiano cross of about 1100 is one of few early survivals; perhaps it has only remained intact because Francis of Assisi had a revelation in front of it around 1206. There are more survivals from later in the century; some are not entirely flat, but have the face and halo protruding somewhat from the main plane, to help visibility from below. It was to make works such as these that Italian panel painters had presumably been trained, as well as combinations of frescos, the painting of sculpture in both wood and stone, and illuminating manuscripts. The main masters of the new Proto-Renaissance, including Cimabue and Giotto, about whose work we have better information, mostly painted both panels and frescos, and sometimes designed mosaics, such as Giotto's Navicella outside Old Saint Peter's Basilica in Rome, and Berlinghiero's on the facade of the Basilica of San Frediano in Lucca. Duccio was an exception here, mainly just painting panels.

== Cretan paintings ==
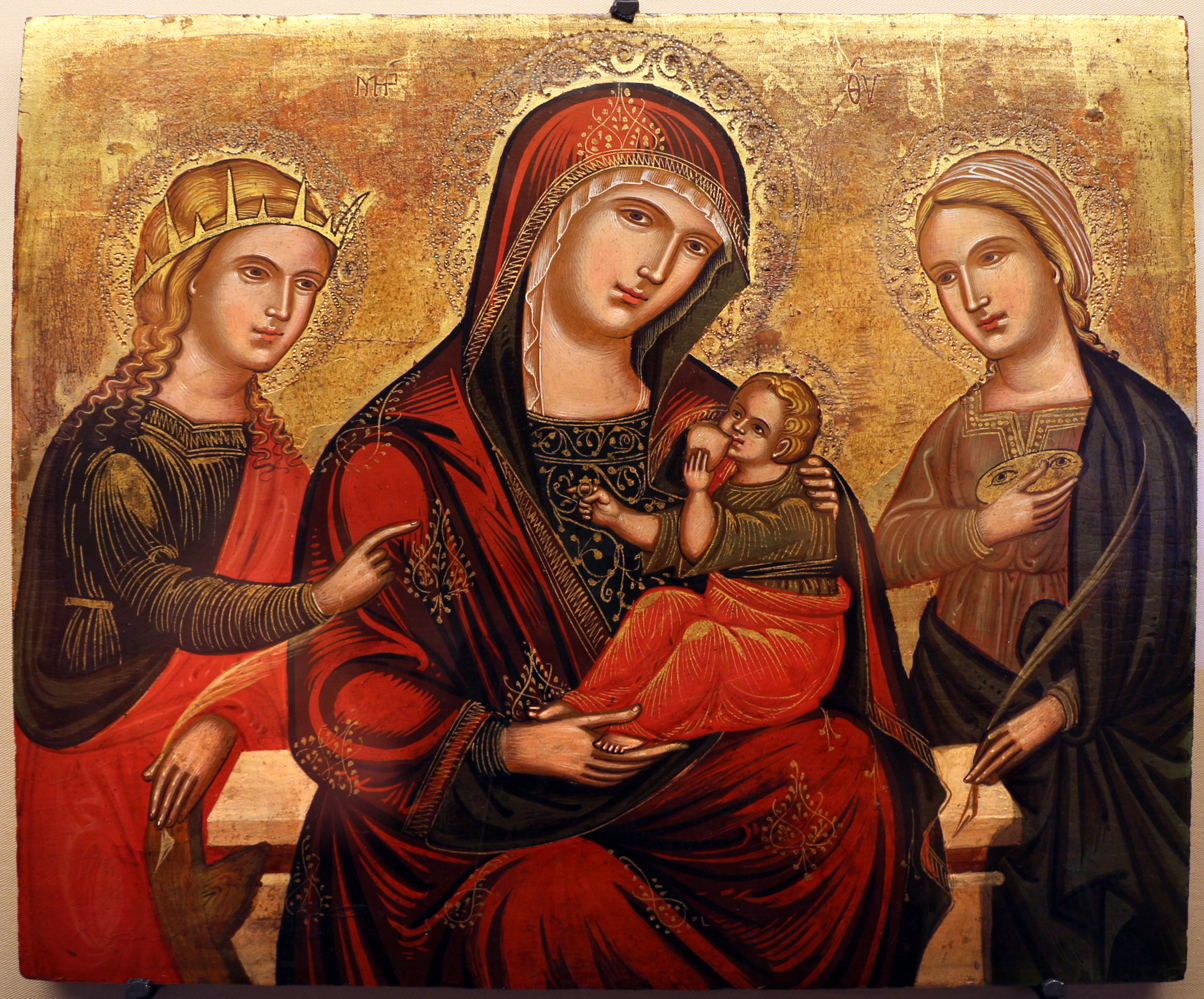
16th-century Virgo lactans with saints, described as "scuola veneto-cretese" (Venetian-Cretan School). The place such works were painted can be hard to decide.

Venetian Crete had a busy painting industry, with Cretan, Italian, and (especially after 1453) mainland Greek artists at work. There are examples both of artists from different backgrounds setting up workshops together, and of both Italian and Cretan patrons commissioning works from a painter of a different background.

At least by the late 15th century, Italian importers also used maniera greca (or in forma greca, alla greca) in their contracts to describe one of the two styles of small and cheap devotional paintings by workshops of the Cretan School which were mass-produced in Crete (then ruled by Venice) for export to the West. The alternative style was alla latina ("Latin style"), mostly a conservative Romanesque or Gothic style, where the Greek-style works followed traditional Byzantine style as far as their cheap price allowed.

The Venetian archives preserve considerable documentation on the trade of artistic icons between Venice and Crete, which by the end of the 15th century had become one of mass production. There is documentation of a specific order in 1499, of 700 icons of the Virgin Mary, 500 in a Western style, and 200 in Byzantine style. The order was placed with three artists by two dealers, one Venetian and one from mainland Greece, and the time between contract date and delivery was set at only forty-five days.

Probably the quality of many such commissioned icons was fairly low, and the dismissive term Madonneri was devised to describe such bulk painters, who later practised in Italy also, often using a quasi-Byzantine style, and apparently often Greek or Dalmatian individuals. Production of icons at these levels seems to have led to a glut in the market, and in the following two decades there is much evidence that the Cretan trade declined significantly, as the European demand had been reduced.

There were also workshops led by masters with a much better reputation, who produced works of much higher quality. El Greco was trained in this part of the Cretan industry, running his own workshop for a few years before he emigrated to Italy in 1567, at the age of about 26. His very individual later Italian style might fairly be characterized as "Italo-Byzantine", though in fact the term is not often used of it.

== Sources ==
- Bacci, Michele. "Veneto-Byzantine 'Hybrids': Towards a Reassessment", Studies in Iconography, vol. 35, 2014, pp. 73–106., JSTOR, Accessed 6 Mar. 2021.
- Boskovits, Miklós, Labriola, Ada, & Tartuferi, Angelo, The Origins of Florentine Painting, 1100–1270, Volume 1, 1993, Giunti, google books
- Christiansen, Keith, Madonna and Child, by Berlinghiero, Metropolitan Museum of Art catalogue page, 2011
- Dodwell, C.R.; The Pictorial arts of the West, 800–1200, 1993, Yale UP, ISBN 0300064934
- Drandaki, Anastasia, "A Maniera Greca: content, context and transformation of a term" Studies in Iconography 35, 2014, pp. 39–72, online
- Evans, Helen C. (ed.), Byzantium, Faith and Power (1261–1557), 2004, Metropolitan Museum of Art/Yale University Press, ISBN 1-58839-114-0 (the relevant entries on pp. 582–588 are by Maryan Wynn Ainsworth)
- Keck, Andrew S. "A Group of Italo-Byzantine Ivories." The Art Bulletin, vol. 12, no. 2, 1930, pp. 147–162, JSTOR. Accessed 3 Mar. 2021.
- Lingo, Estelle Cecile, François Duquesnoy and the Greek Ideal, 2007, Yale University Press, ISBN 9780300124835, google books
- Matthews, Karen Rose, Conflict, Commerce, and an Aesthetic of Appropriation in the Italian Maritime Cities, 1000–1150, 2018, BRILL, google books
- Meagher, Jennifer. "Italian Painting of the Later Middle Ages." In Heilbrunn Timeline of Art History. New York: The Metropolitan Museum of Art, 2000–. online, September 2010
- Nagel, Alexander, and Wood, Christopher S., Anachronic Renaissance, 2020, Zone Books, MIT Press, ISBN 9781942130345, google books
- Panofsky, Erwin, Renaissance and Renascences in Western Art (1960), 1972, Icon/Harper & Row, ISBN 0064300269
- Shrimplin, Valerie, Giotto and the Early Italian Resistance, 2021, Online lecture from Gresham College
- Steer, John, Venetian painting: A concise history, 1970, London: Thames and Hudson (World of Art), ISBN 0500201013
- "Virgin and Child", Italian Renaissance Learning Resources, Oxford Art Online In collaboration with the National Gallery of Art, online
- Voulgaropoulou, Margarita, "From Domestic Devotions to the Church Altar: Venerating Icons in the Late Medieval and Early Modern Adriatic", in Ryan, Salvador (ed), Domestic Devotions in Medieval and Early Modern Europe, 2020, MDPI Books, (reprint from Religions in 2019), online
