= Cambrai Madonna =

14th-century painting

Coordinates: 50.1722°N 3.2333°E

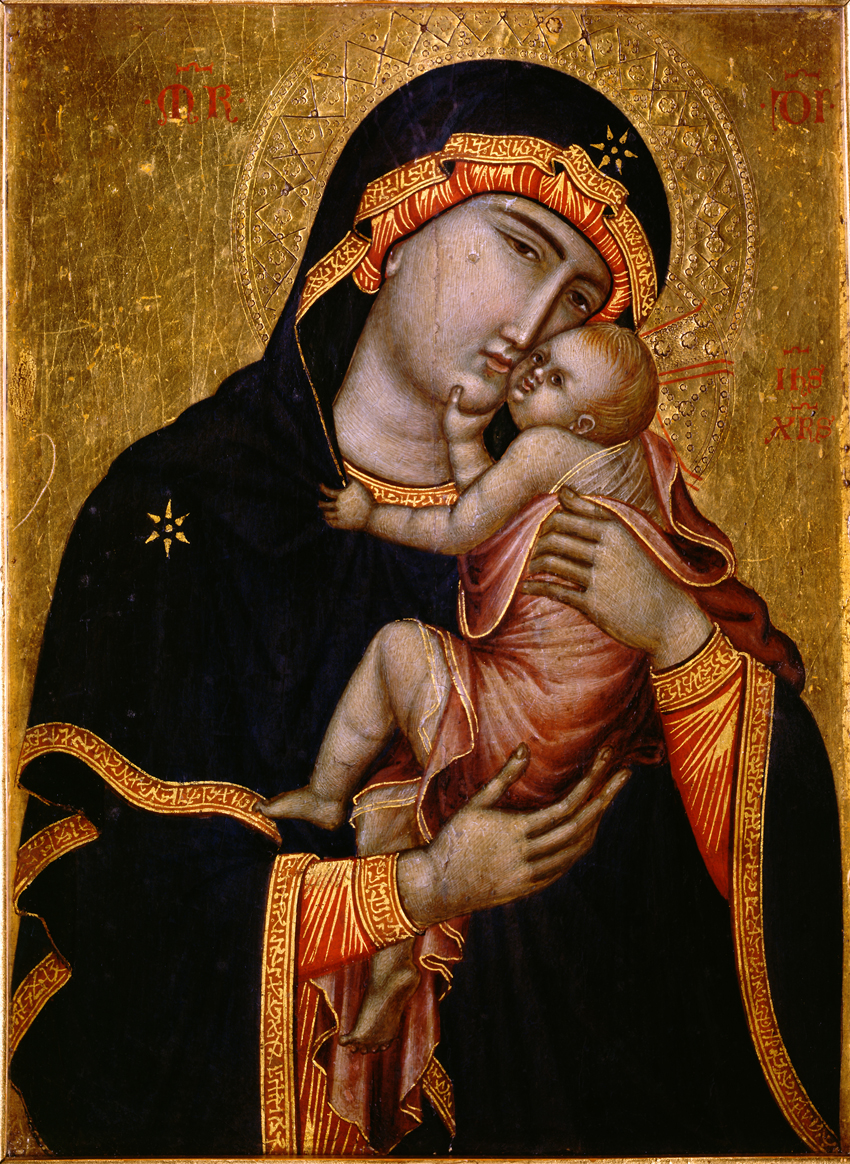
The Cambrai Madonna, (anonymous), c. 1340. Tempera on cedar panel. 35.7 cm x 25.7 cm. Cambrai Cathedral, France.

The Cambrai Madonna, also called the Notre-Dame de Grâce, produced around 1340, is a small Italo-Byzantine, possibly Sienese, replica of an Eleusa (Virgin of Tenderness) icon. The work on which it is based is believed to have originated in Tuscany c. 1300, and influenced a wide number of paintings from the following century as well as Florentine sculptures from the 1440–1450s. This version was in turn widely copied across Italy and northern Europe during the 14th and 15th centuries; Filippo Lippi's 1447 Enthroned Madonna and Child is a well known example.

When in 1450 the painting was brought to Cambrai, then part of the Holy Roman Empire ruled by the Dukes of Burgundy and now in France, it was believed an original by Saint Luke, patron saint of artists, for which Mary herself had sat as model. Thus it was treated as a relic; God bestowing miracles on those that travelled to view it.

The work is significant beyond its aesthetic value: it serves as a bridge between the Byzantine icon tradition and the Italian Quattrocento, and inspired the work of 15th-century Netherlandish artists. After the Ottoman Turks had conquered Constantinople, copies of the painting were commissioned in the Low Countries in support of Philip the Good's projected crusade, announced at the Feast of the Pheasant but never launched.

== Description ==
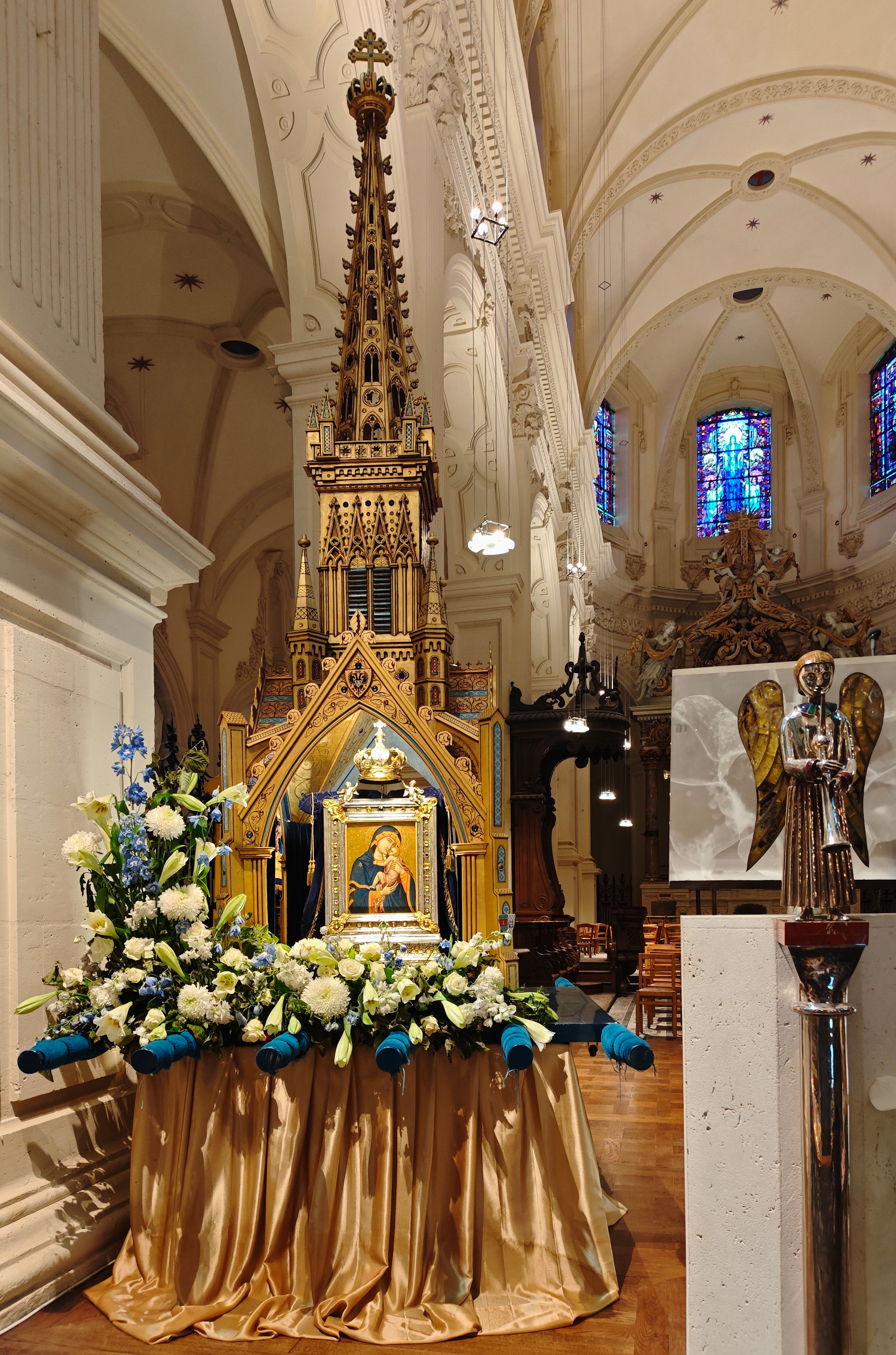
Our Lady of Grace, the patron saint of the diocese of Cambrai in the Cathedral of Our Lady of Grace, Cambrai

The painting is in tempera on a cedar panel, now backed by a modern board. It measures 35.5 x 26.5 cm, and is in generally good condition, with some local retouching. The initials "MR, DI, IHS, XRS" stand for the Latin Mater Dei, Jesu Christus, "Mother of God, Jesus Christ". It displays the gilded, decorated background typical of Byzantine devotional paintings, while Mary is dressed in a blue robe with gold lined edging. Christ, also typically of such Madonna and child works, possesses the body of an adult male rather that of an infant. He is burly, and far too large for a newborn child.

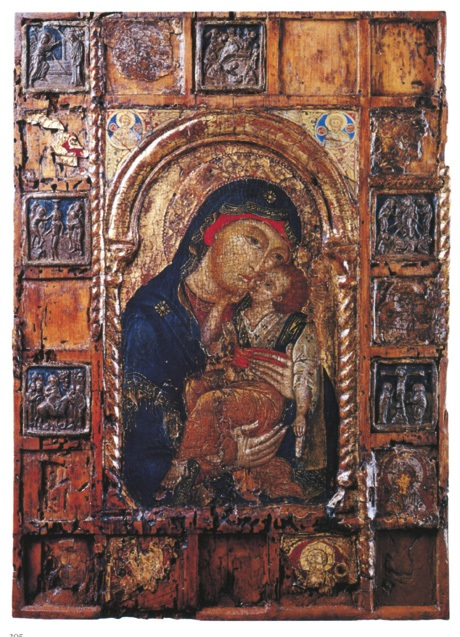
Icon of the Virgin Eleousa, Venice, mid-14th century

Mary is described by scholars as an Eleusa icon because of the tender manner in which the child is nestled against her cheek, setting the image as an intimate portrayal of the bond between mother and child. Her head is tilted towards her son and embraces his forehead and cheek almost as if in a kiss, while her arms warmly cradle him. He has one leg bent and another extended towards her, while his right arm is held upright and intimately holds her chin from below. This closeness and engagement of mother and child is a departure from Byzantine tradition, where they were often shown almost at arm's length, and was in tune with the ideals of the Italian Quattrocento.

The Italian origin of the work is shown in "the more subtle modeling of the faces, the volumetric aspect of the draperies with soft folds, the Latin inscriptions", and the style of the "elaborate punchwork of the haloes". A number of oddities in the different versions indicate that the many Italian versions came from a single source; primarily the closeness of the two figures' faces, their seeming embrace, as well as the unusual concentration of the child's facial features in a small portion of his head, which gives him an unusually long forehead.

== Legend and history ==
The Cambrai Madonna was acquired by Jean Allarmet Cardinal of Brogny (d. 1426), who gave it to his secretary Fursy de Bruille, a canon of the Cambrai cathedral chapter, in Rome in 1440. De Bruille brought it to Cambrai, accepting its provenance as a work painted by Saint Luke, and in 1450 presented it to the Old Cambrai Cathedral, where it was installed with great ceremony in its Chapel of the Holy Trinity the following year on August 13, the eve of the Feast of the Assumption. Almost immediately it became the object of fervent pilgrimage, reflecting a contemporary appetite for new types of devotional imagery. A confraternity was established in 1453 for the "care and veneration" of the relic, which from 1455 was carried in procession through the town on the Feast of the Assumption (August 15).

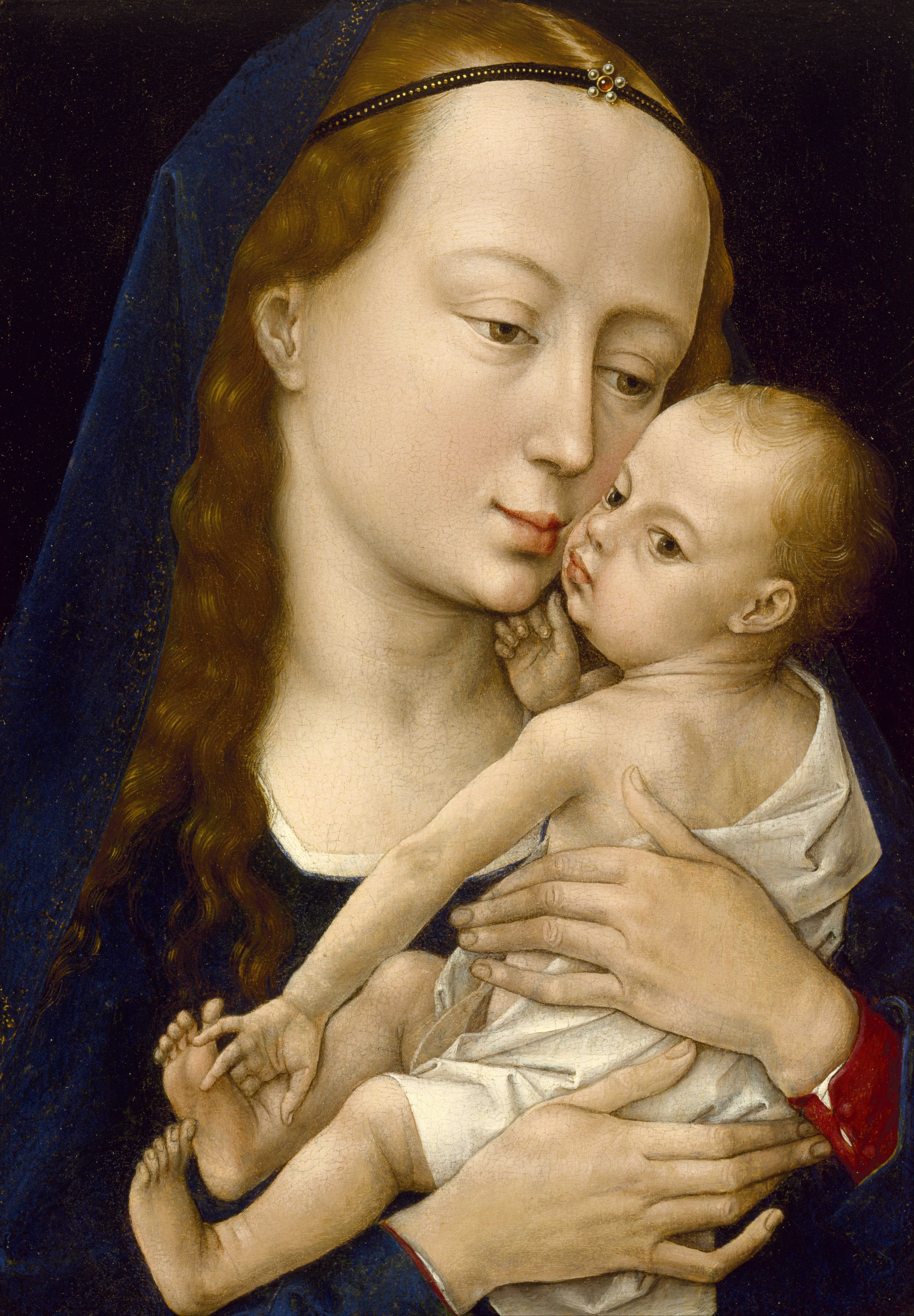
Rogier van der Weyden, Virgin and Child. A free half length interpretation of the Cambrai Madonna by van der Weyden, after 1454. van der Weyden's copy was later adapted by Dieric Bouts.

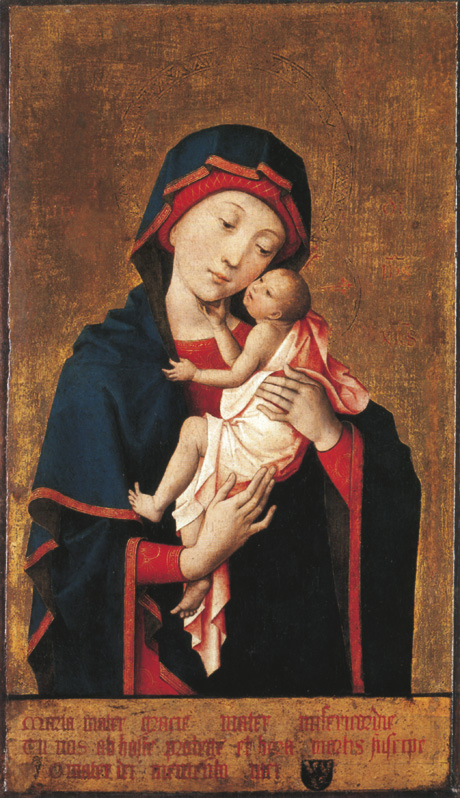
Hayne of Brussels, Virgin & Child, 15th century, Nelson-Atkins Museum of Art, Kansas City.

The legend that developed around the icon held that it was secretly revered in Jerusalem during the persecutions. It was supposedly gifted to Aelia Pulcheria, daughter of Eastern Roman Emperor Arcadius in 430 and taken to Constantinople where it was publicly honored over the centuries.

In Cambrai, the work attracted thousands of pilgrims, including Philip the Good (1457), Charles the Bold (1460), and Louis XI, who left his kingdom to see it in 1468, 1477 and 1478. Philip the Good encouraged the growth of a cult around the painting, commissioning numerous copies following the Fall of Constantinople in 1453. Philip hoped that the Cambrai Madonna would serve as a significant icon, around which he could rally sufficient religious fervour to launch a crusade to retake the city.

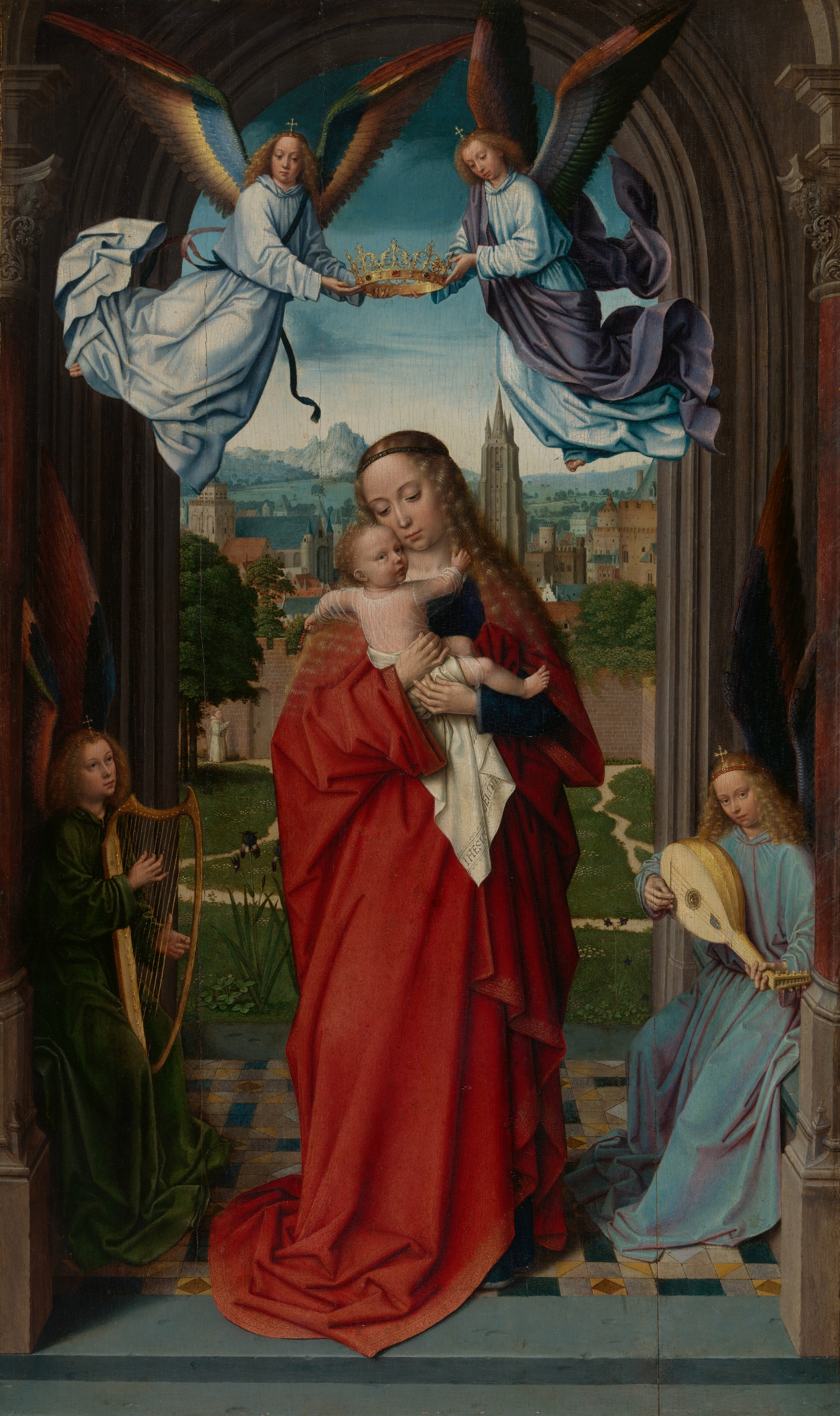
Gerard David, Virgin and Child with Four Angels, c. 1510–15. 63.2 cm × 39.1 cm, Metropolitan Museum of Art.

Byzantine Madonnas, and their Italian derivatives, were widely used as prototypes by Early Netherlandish artists from the 1420s with Robert Campin and Jan van Eyck. This was a period when commerce and a desire for piety and salvation, and sometimes politics, drove the commissioners of devotional art works. Painters who explicitly adapted the Cambrai Madonna include Petrus Christus who was commissioned in 1454 to produce three separate copies, Rogier van der Weyden, Dieric Bouts and Gerard David. In general the Netherlandish artists sought to further humanise the image, through such devices as extending the child's arm towards his mother and painting the child in a more realistic manner.

An initial burst of copies were probably connected with Philip's fund-raising for his rescue of Constantinople. The Bishop of Cambrai from 1439 to 1479 was John of Burgundy, Philip the Good's illegitimate half-brother, and in June 1455 the cathedral chapter commissioned twelve copies from Hayne of Brussels for twenty pounds, of which one is believed to survive, now in the Nelson-Atkins Museum of Art in Kansas City, Missouri. Like the van der Weyden in Houston, this freely interprets the Cambrai original in a contemporary Netherlandish style; the Madonna's faces are of a Northern European type, and their bodies fuller. In both adaptations, the Madonna's gaze has been significantly altered, she now looks directly at the child and not outwards at the viewer.

The three Petrus Christi copies were commissioned by John, Count of Étampes, who was both Philip's first cousin through his father (and the bishop's nephew), and stepson, as his mother Bonne of Artois had married Philip after her husband was killed at Agincourt. The count was "warden and councilor of the cathedral". Both sets of copies may have been for distribution to courtiers, either to promote contributions to Philip's fundraising, or as a reward to those who had already contributed. The count's three copies cost twenty Flemish pounds, while the chapter's twelve cost only a pound each, a point which has generated much scholarly discussion.

A miniature by Simon Bening of c. 1520, now in the Museum of Fine Arts, Ghent, shows an interpretation of the model into a later style. Other copies of various periods, some of which have been advanced as members of the commissioned sets mentioned above, follow the original much more exactly. Such parallel use of styles is characteristic of the period; there was a considerable industry importing cheaper icons by the Cretan School to Europe, which could be ordered in bulk specifying either Greek or Latin styles.

On 14 May 1894, the icon of the Cambrai Madonna was crowned by Pope Leo XIII.
