= Diptych of Philip de Croÿ with The Virgin and Child =

Pair of paintings by Rogier van der Weyden

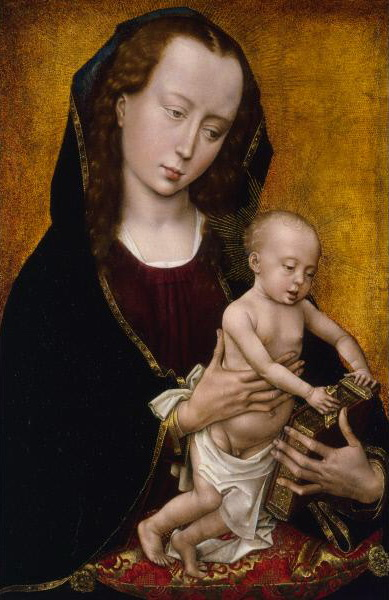
Virgin and Child, 1460, Huntington Library, San Marino, CA.

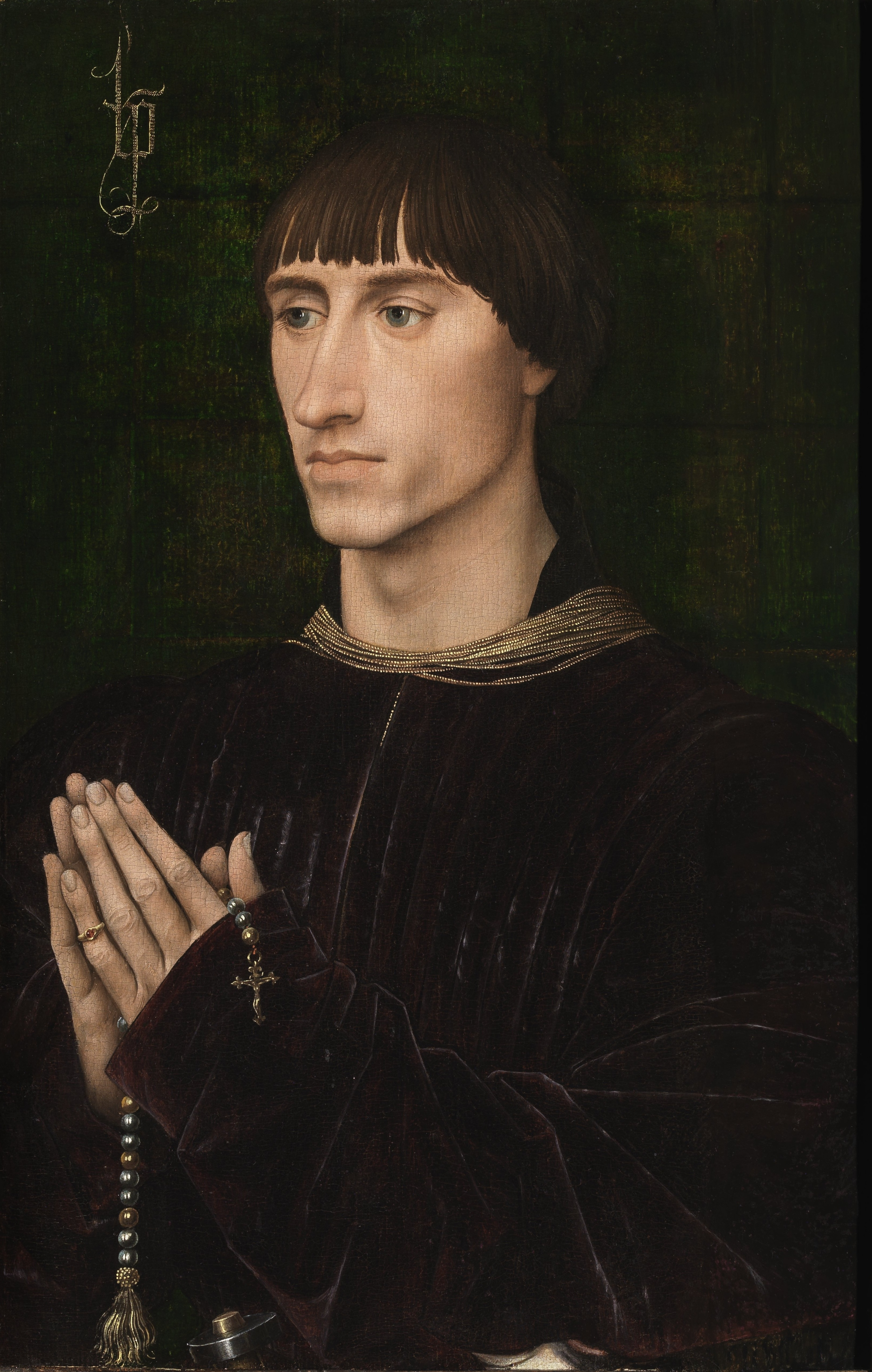
Portrait of Philippe I de Croÿ, 1460, Koninklijk Museum voor Schone Kunsten, Antwerp. 49 cm × 30 cm

The Diptych of Philip de Croÿ with The Virgin and Child consists of a pair of small oil-on-oak panels painted c. 1460 by the Netherlandish artist Rogier van der Weyden. While the authorship and dating of both works are not in doubt, it is believed but not proven that they were created as wings of a devotional diptych and that at some unknown time the panels were broken apart. A diptych panel fitting the description of the Mary wing was described in a 1629 inventory of paintings owned by Alexandre d'Arenberg, a descendant of Philip I de Croÿ (1435–1511). Both have been approximately dated to 1460 and are now in Antwerp and San Marino, CA respectively. The reverse of de Croÿ's portrait is inscribed with the family crest and the title used by the sitter from 1454 to 1461.

The right-hand panel depicts Philip I de Croÿ, chamberlain to Philip the Good and comte de Chimay from 1472 until his death, possibly at battle, in 1482. De Croÿ would have been around 25 at the time of the portrait, and the style of his haircut has been used to approximately date the work. The left wing, today in San Marino, shows the Virgin and Child on a gold ground depicted in a style indebted to Byzantine Marian icons, and their Italo-Byzantine derivatives.

Van der Weyden underscores the idea of the Virgin panel being an unearthly apparition before the donor by giving her wing a golden background, which contrasts sharply with de Croÿ's more muted and ordinary flat backdrop. The artist further establishes a link between the human and divine through the playful manner of given to Christ. As with van der Weyden's other mother and child diptych, the child faces the donor, while his hand is stretched outwards, almost beyond the boundary of the right-hand panel, as if to make a connection with the donor to the left. Art historian Martha Wolff suggests the implication of this gesture is to extend the connection to the actual viewer presumably worshipping at the diptych—like de Croÿ before the mother and child.

== Description ==
After van der Weyden was appointed official painter to the city of Brussels in 1436, he became a highly sought after painter of both secular and donor portraits. While the surviving works of his mid-career are mainly single religious works and triptychs, by c. 1460, his reputation and the demand for his work were such that he seems to have concentrated on commissions. These panels are amongst four confirmed diptychs where he paired the patron opposite a representation of the Virgin and Child. In all a half-length male patron is represented on the left wing, with the tell-tale motif of hands folded in prayer. The Virgin and Child are always positioned on the right, reflecting the Christian reverence for the right-hand side as the "place of honour" alongside the divine. Similarly, the donor's portrait is always set against a flat dark nondescript background, while the Virgin and Child are framed against brilliantly lit golden or gilded backdrops. van der Weyden is widely credited as the first to use the diptych format for donor portraits and for establishing conventions that were to last until the mid 16th century; His are the first to combine a half length portrait (of the donor) with a half length depiction of a saint or saints. The pairing with the Mary panel appeared as a vision appearing before the donor.

The monograph on the top left of de Croÿ's panel has not been definitively interpreted, but is very similar to scrests on manuscripts known to have been in his collection. Like Philip the Good, de Croÿ was cultured, strongly interested in and a patron and collector of visual artworks. He was active as both a soldier and later as an ambassador, while at the same time he was a bibliophile and noted collector of illuminated manuscripts. He amassed a renowned library; it is thought that the inclusion of the lavishly embroidered book in the Mary panel was intended to flatter him.

=== Virgin and Child ===
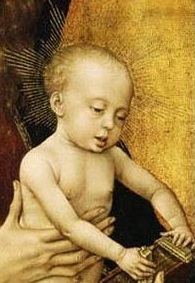
Crop of the Virgin and Child panel, showing the halo built from golden beams of light radiating outwards from his head

In the early 15th century, Mary grew in importance as a possible intercessor between God and members of the Catholic faith. The concept of purgatory as an intermediary state that each human soul had to pass through before they were admitted to heaven was at its height. It was thought that the length each person would need to suffer in limbo was proportional to their display of devotion while on earth. Prayer was the most obvious means of decreasing time in limbo, while the more well-off substituted by commissioning churches, church extensions, or artworks such as devotional portraits. Mary, although underrepresented in the gospels, developed a cult that gathered from the 13th century, mostly built on the idea of the Immaculate Conception and her ascension into heaven. Thus, in a culture that venerated the possession of relics as a means to bring the earthly closer to the divine, Mary could have left no bodily relics, thus assuming a special position between heaven and humanity.

The veneration that developed around her in this period led to a high demand for donor portraits, with the commissioner shown in devotion. Van der Weyden responded with half-length Marian portraits which echoed in style and colour the Byzantine icons then popular in Italy as "miracle" working paintings. The format became extremely popular in the north, and his innovation is a major contributing reason for the emergence of Marian and after more general devotional diptychs as a lasting format of Early Netherlandish painting.

Mary is shown against a gilded background, holding the infant Christ's hand. She wears a dark, hooded cloak or veil over a red dress. The infant stands unsteadily on a highly decorated and embroidered red and yellow cushion. He is shown as restless and energetic, toying with the clasps of a prayer book. Both figures have golden halos which radiate outwards as if beams of light. Mary shares many of the idealised facial features seen in late-period van der Weyden depictions of the Madonna; she has olive eyes, a high forehead, and symmetrical, arched eyebrows.

The painting first emerged in 1892 as part of Henry Willett's collection in Brighton. It passed through the Kann collection in Paris, and is today on display at the Huntington Library in San Marino, California.

=== Philip de Croÿ ===
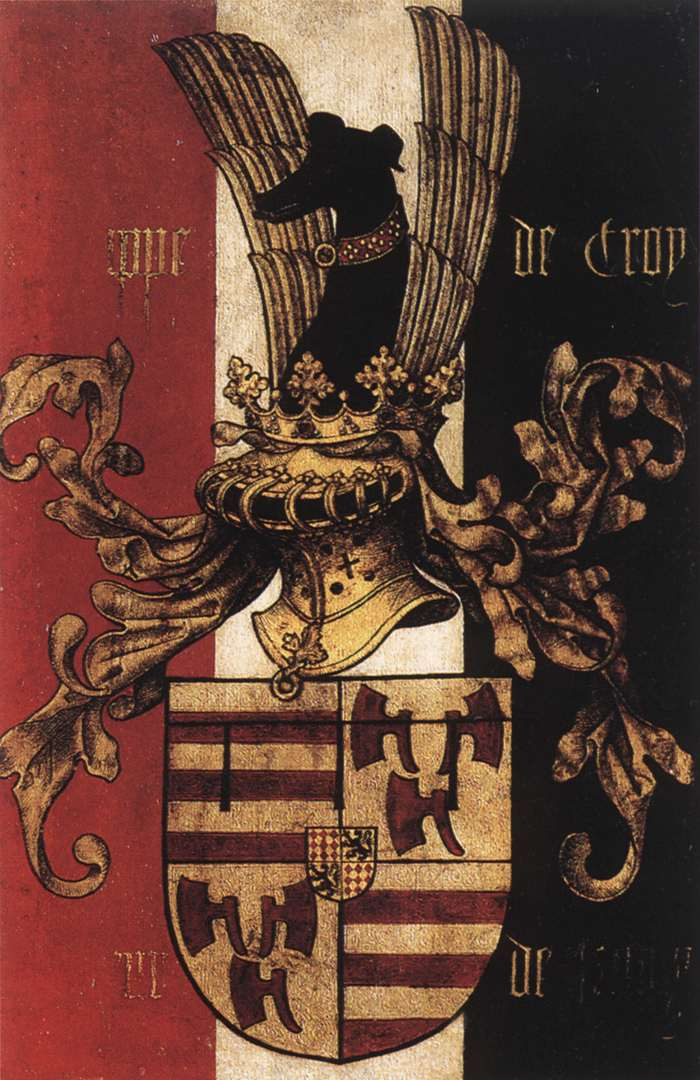
Crest shown on the reverse of de Croÿ's panel

De Croÿ is shown in half length, wearing a high-necked dark purple doublet with fur lining. His hands are folded in prayer. He holds a pearled rosary between his thumbs and index fingers, the stones of which reflect the light falling on him. One end of the string ends with a gold braided tassel, the other with a gilded crucifix. The portrait is set against a background of pleated green cloth, which has been laid down on silver leaf in slim layers of verdigris glaze. The quality, subtlety and craftsmanship behind the subtlety was only revealed in a recent restoration; previously the area was covered by layers of accumulated dirt, and it had been thought that the portrait was set against a simple dark plane. The background is decorated with a monograph which has not yet been positively identified, although it does appear in manuscripts that Philip owned.

Van der Weyden flatters his sitter by endeavouring to conceal the young Belgian's large nose and undershot jaw, presenting a picture of a refined and pious nobleman. The artist typically dignified his sitters by depicting elongated facial features, delicate fingers and other idealised features which the subject may not have been blessed with in life. This tendency can be seen in the description of de Croÿ's strong jaw and sculpted nose.

==== Hair style and dating of painting ====
The painting can be approximately dated from the late 1450s to early 1460s by de Croÿ's haircut, which is long at the front and above the ears but shaved at the sides and below the ears. He wears a clipped and straight-length fringe, a monkish fashion popular among male Burgundian nobles during this period. The high cut below the ear is similar to that seen worn by Nicolas Rolin in Jan van Eyck's c. 1435 Madonna of Chancellor Rolin, however de Croÿ's side cut is not as severe or pronounced, and is accompanied by a longer fringe too daring for even a few years earlier. This is assuming that the sitter is Burgundian and not a foreign visitor; the identifying crest on the outer wings as well as his pointed Northern European facial features argue against this possibility.

== See also ==
- List of works by Rogier van der Weyden
