= Cambrai Cathedral =

Catholic cathedral in Cambrai, France

Cambrai Cathedral Cathédrale Notre-Dame-de-Grâce
- Picard: Cathédrale Noter-Danme-dé-Grâche
- Cambrai Cathedral

Religion
- Affiliation: Catholic Church
- Diocese: Archdiocese of Cambrai
- Rite: Latin Rite
- Ecclesiastical or organisational status: Cathedral

Location
- Location: Cambrai, France
- Interactive map of Cambrai Cathedral; Cathédrale Notre-Dame-de-Grâce
- Coordinates: 50°10′20″N 3°14′0″E

Architecture
- Type: Church
- Style: Neoclassical
- Groundbreaking: 1696-1703

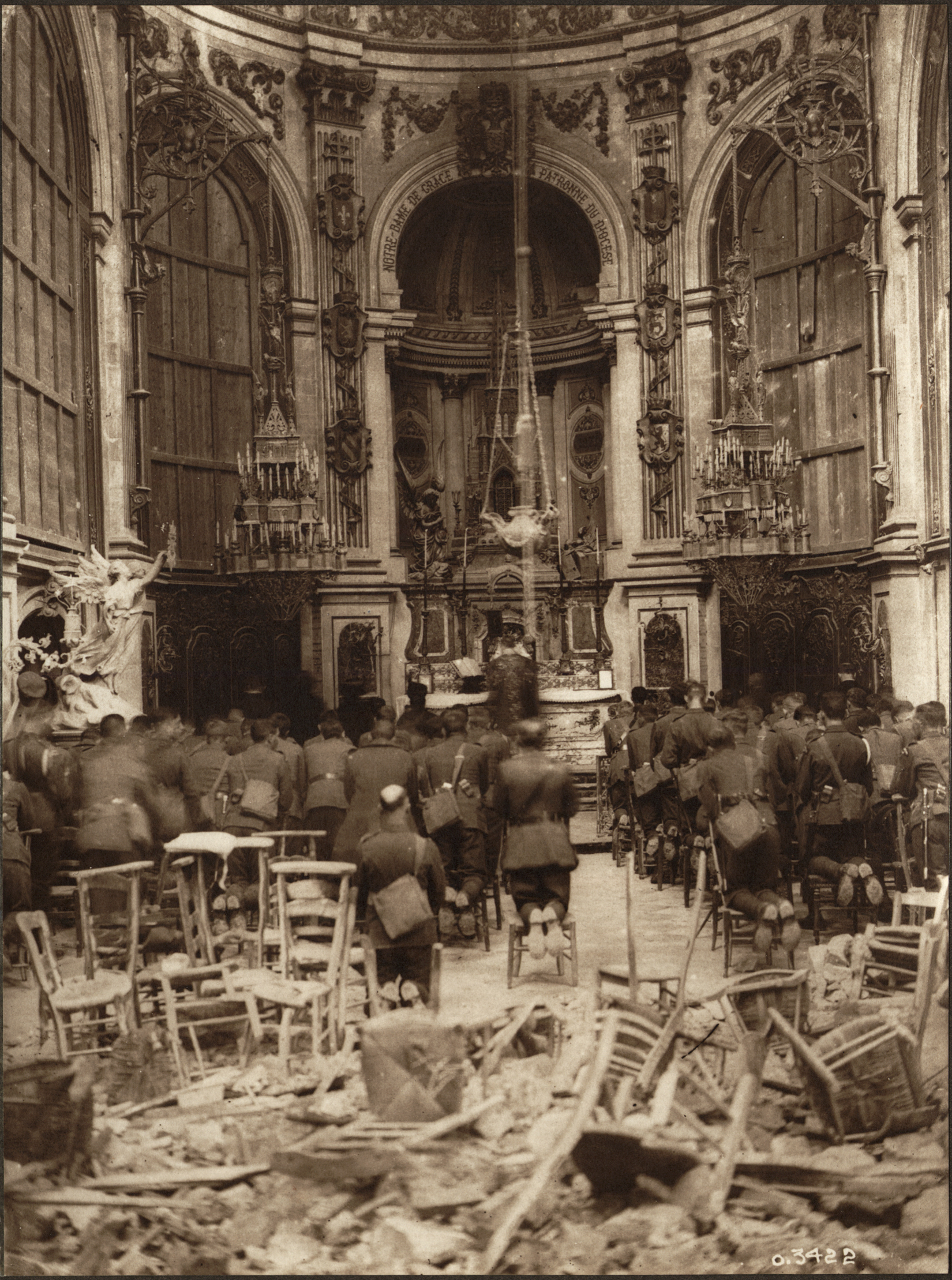
A Thanksgiving Service attended by Canadian troops being held in the Cambrai Cathedral, October, 1918

Cambrai Cathedral (French: Cathédrale Notre-Dame de Grâce de Cambrai; Picard: Cathédrale Noter-Danme-dé-Grâche dé Kimbré) is a Catholic church located in Cambrai, Nord, France, and is the seat of the Archbishop of Cambrai. The cathedral was registered as a monument historique on 9 August 1906.

It was built between 1696 and 1703, on the site of a former 11th-century building, as the church of the Abbey of Saint-Sépulcre. During the French Revolution the old cathedral of Cambrai was destroyed, but the abbey church survived because it was used instead as a Temple of Reason. When the ecclesiastical status of Cambrai was restored in 1802, albeit as a diocese rather than as an archdiocese, which it had previously been, the bishop's seat was established in the surviving abbey church, which became the cathedral of Cambrai. Cambrai was again constituted an archbishopric in 1841.

The cathedral was severely damaged by fire in 1859, but at length restored, with advice from Viollet-le-Duc, and consecrated on 12 May 1894. It was raised to the status of a basilica minor by Pope Leo XIII on 17 March 1896.

It was also badly damaged in World War I and, not so seriously, in World War II.

It contains the tomb, by David d'Anger, of François Fénelon, who was archbishop from 1696 to 1715. The Cathedral is a minor pilgrimage site because of the noted Italo-Byzantine painting known as the Cambrai Madonna or Our Lady of Cambrai (c. 1340) in a side chapel. The cathedral now takes its dedication name "Notre-Dame de Grâce" or "Virgin of Tenderness" from this painting, from the Eleusa icon type it exemplifies. In the same chapel is a memorial erected by Hilaire Belloc to commemorate his son who was killed nearby in the last days of World War I.

The Oculus of the Assumption of the Virgin Mary: this work by Augustin Frison-Roche, measuring 3.78 metres in diameter, was presented to the public in March 2025 before being installed at a height of 21 metres at the crossing of the transept.

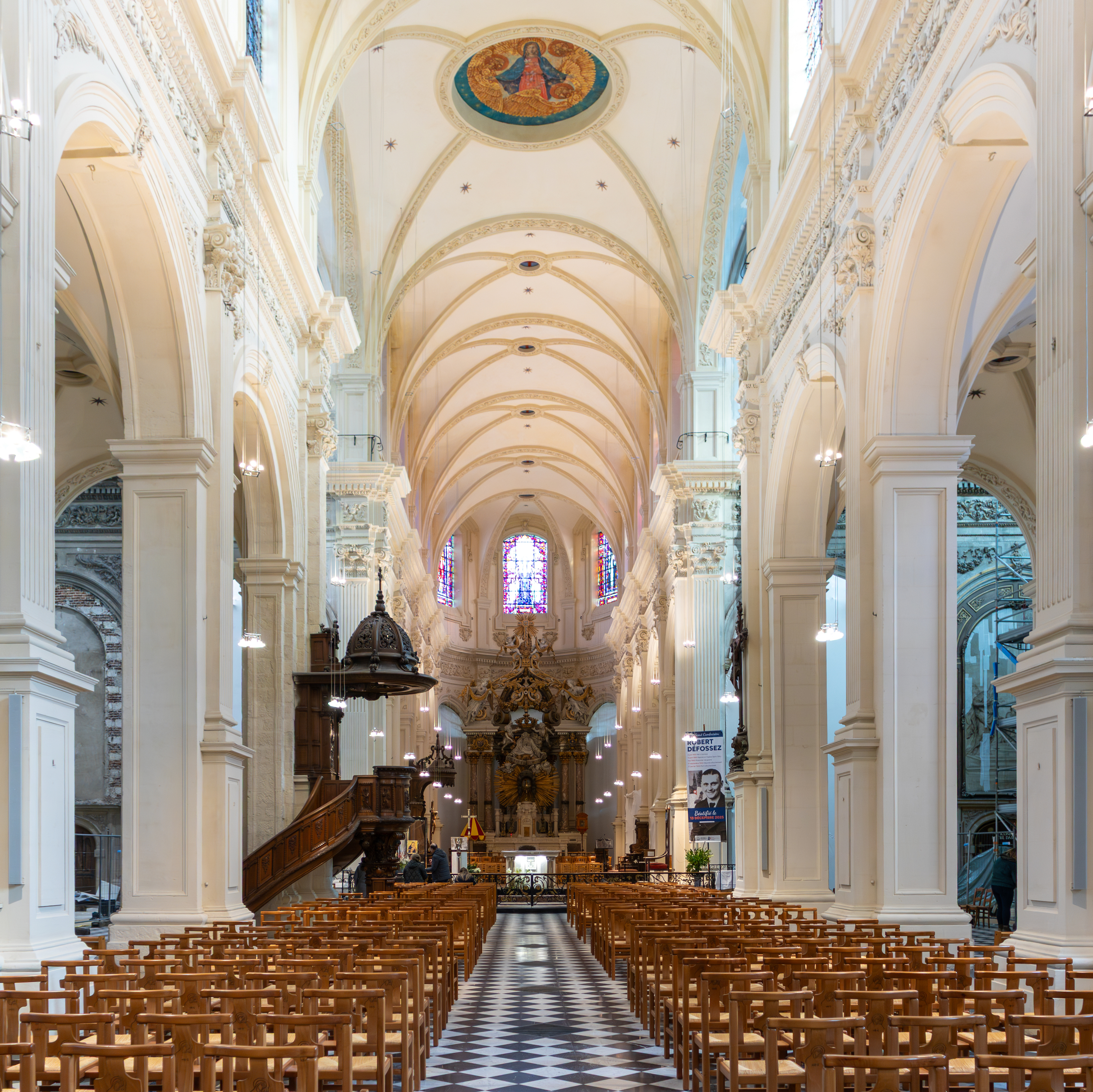
The nave renovated in 2025

== Sources ==
- Eugène Bouly, Histoire de Cambrai et du Cambrésis, vol. 1, Cambrai, Hattu, Libraire-Éditeur, 1842 (version)
- Eugène Bouly, Histoire de Cambrai et du Cambrésis, vol. 2, Cambrai, Hattu, Libraire-Éditeur, 1842 (version)
- Jules Houdoy, Histoire artistique de la cathédrale de Cambrai, Paris: D. Morgand and C. Fatout, 1880 (version)
- Louis Trenard (dir.) and Charles Pietri, Histoire des Pays-Bas Français, Édouard Privat, coll. "Univers de la France et des Pays francophones / Histoire des Provinces", 1974 (1st ed. 1974)
- Louis Trenard (dir.) and Michel Rouche (preface by Jacques Legendre), Histoire de Cambrai, vol. 2, Presses Universitaires de Lille, coll. "Histoire des villes du Nord / Pas-de-Calais", 1982 (1st ed. 1982), 314 p. ISBN 2859392017
- Michel Dussart (dir.), Mémoire de Cambrai, Cambrai, Société d'Emulation de Cambrai, 2004, 220 p. ISBN 2858450013
- Revue du Nord, Louis Trenard (dir.), Université de Lille III, Villeneuve d'Ascq, Tome LVIII no 230, numéro spécial "Cambrai et le Cambrésis", juillet-septembre 1976
- Henri Jenny, Cathédrale de Cambrai: l'abbaye du Saint-Sépulcre, Cambrai, Mallez impr., 1970, 48 p.
