= Master of the Legend of the Magdalen =

Early Netherlandish painter (f. 1483–1537)

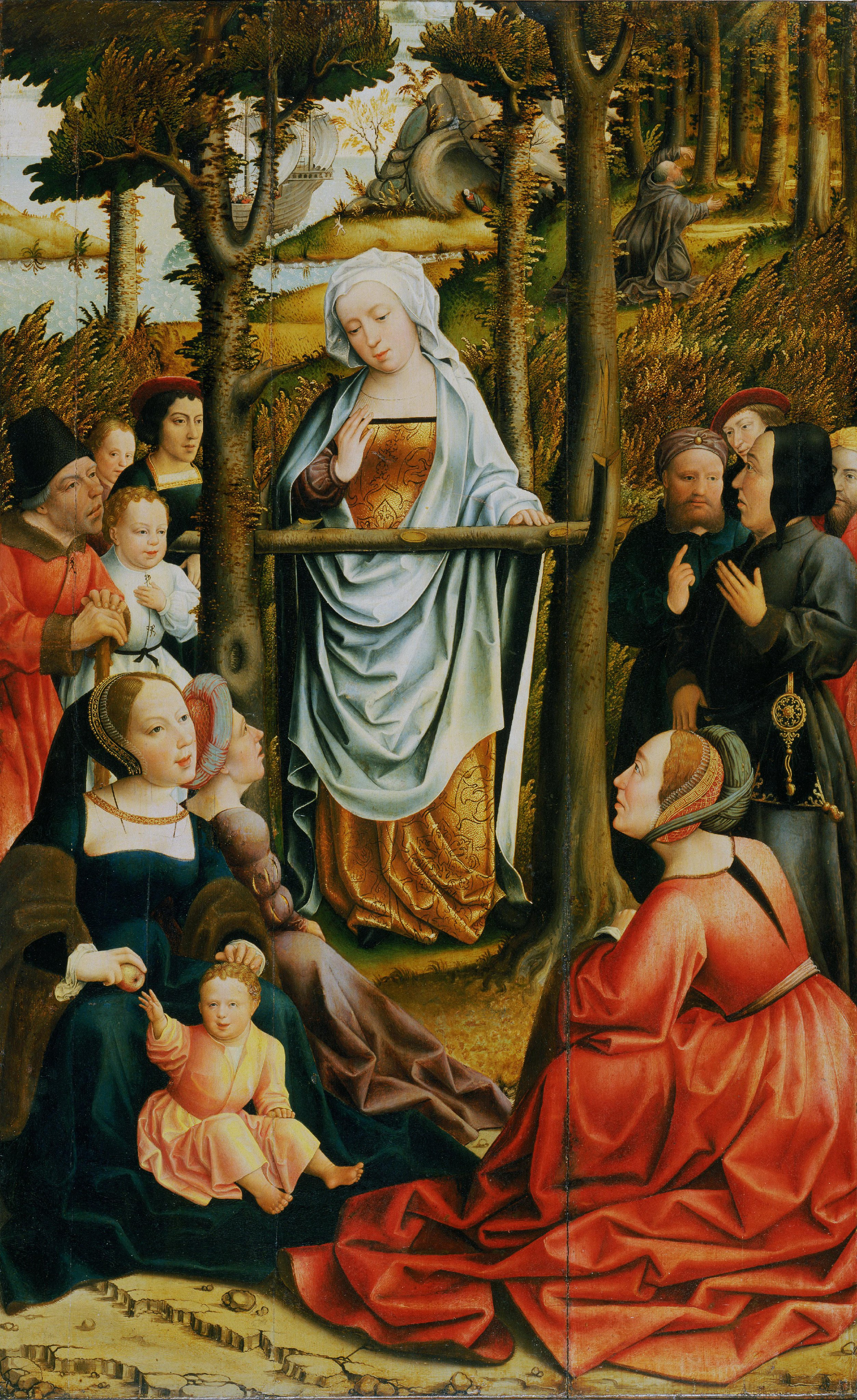
Saint Mary Magdalene Preaching, the Philadelphia Museum of Art

The Master of the Legend of the Magdalen (sometimes called the Master of the Magdalen Legend) was an Early Netherlandish painter active from circa 1483 to 1527. He has not been identified. His Notname (name of convenience) was coined by the art historian Max Friedländer and is derived from a large, now-dispersed polyptych with scenes from the life of Mary Magdalene. Based on the costumes of the donor portraits, this work has been dated to between 1515 and 1520. Many paintings have been attributed to the Master based on similarities with the polyptych. The Master painted religious subjects as well as portraits. The Master was not an innovator as his work relies heavily on the older Netherlandish style of Rogier van der Weyden with some inspiration from the innovations introduced in Netherlandish paintings by Bernard van Orley who had been in contact with contemporary Italian art.

== Identity and milieu of the artist ==
The Master is not to be confused with the anonymous Flemish Master of the Mansi Magdalen (fl. ?Antwerp, c. 1515–25) or the Italian Magdalen Master (fl. Florence, c. 1265–90).

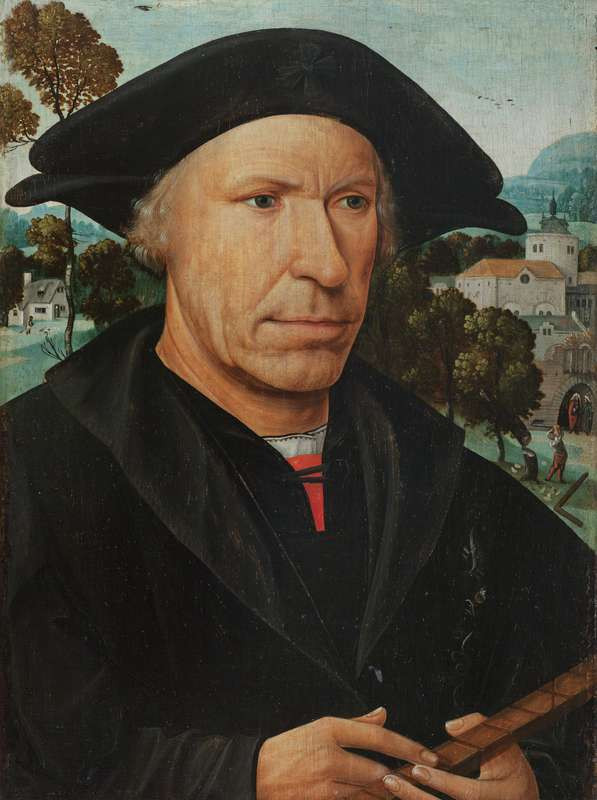
Portrait of an Elderly Man Holding a Tally Stick, National Gallery Prague

Some of his portrait paintings suggest a link with artists in Brussels. It is thought that he worked and headed a large workshop in that city. An early influence appears to have been Rogier van der Weyden. His work also shares characteristics with that of Bernard van Orley. A link with Joos van Cleve has also been suggested. Like van Orley, the artist is believed to have been active at the court of Margaret of Habsburg, regent of the Habsburg Netherlands from 1507 until 1530. The Master produced many portraits of the members of the Burgundian court, including Mary of Burgundy and her children, Philip the Handsome and Margaret of Austria.

Max Friedländer had proposed Pieter van Coninxloo and William Scrots as possible identifications for the Master, as both artists were active at the Burgundian court in Brussels around the same time and there are stylistic similarities with their works. It is also possible that van Coninxloo was for some time a member of the Master's workshop.

== Works ==
The Holy Family, Royal Museum of Fine Arts Antwerp

Friedländer first gave the Master his name and reconstructed the oeuvre of the Master starting from two panels from a polyptych depicting scenes from the life of the Magdalen dated to about 1515–1520. One of these, Saint Mary Magdalene Preaching, is now in the Philadelphia Museum of Art, while the other, The Magdalen before her Conversion, was formerly in the Kaiser-Friedrich Museum in Berlin (it was destroyed during World War II). Art historian Maquet-Tombu subsequently reconstructed the polyptych, adding four further works: Portrait of a donor with Saint Louis and Christ as a gardener and Portrait of a female donor with her daughter, and Saints Mary Magdalene and Margaret (both Staatliches Museum Schwerin), Magdalene Washing the Feet of Christ (Museum of Fine Arts (Budapest)) and The Raising of Lazarus (National Gallery of Denmark, Copenhagen). The Master is known for his altarpieces and portraits. It has been difficult to date most of the works attributed to the artist with any accuracy.

The Master was not an innovator. His work falls stylistically between the older Netherlandish style of Rogier van der Weyden and the more innovative approach of Bernard van Orley who had been influenced by contemporary Italian art. He developed a distinctive manner of painting the faces: the male faces are triangular and have hard lines and a pronounced bone structure, while the female faces are softer and rounder and generally with half-closed eyes.

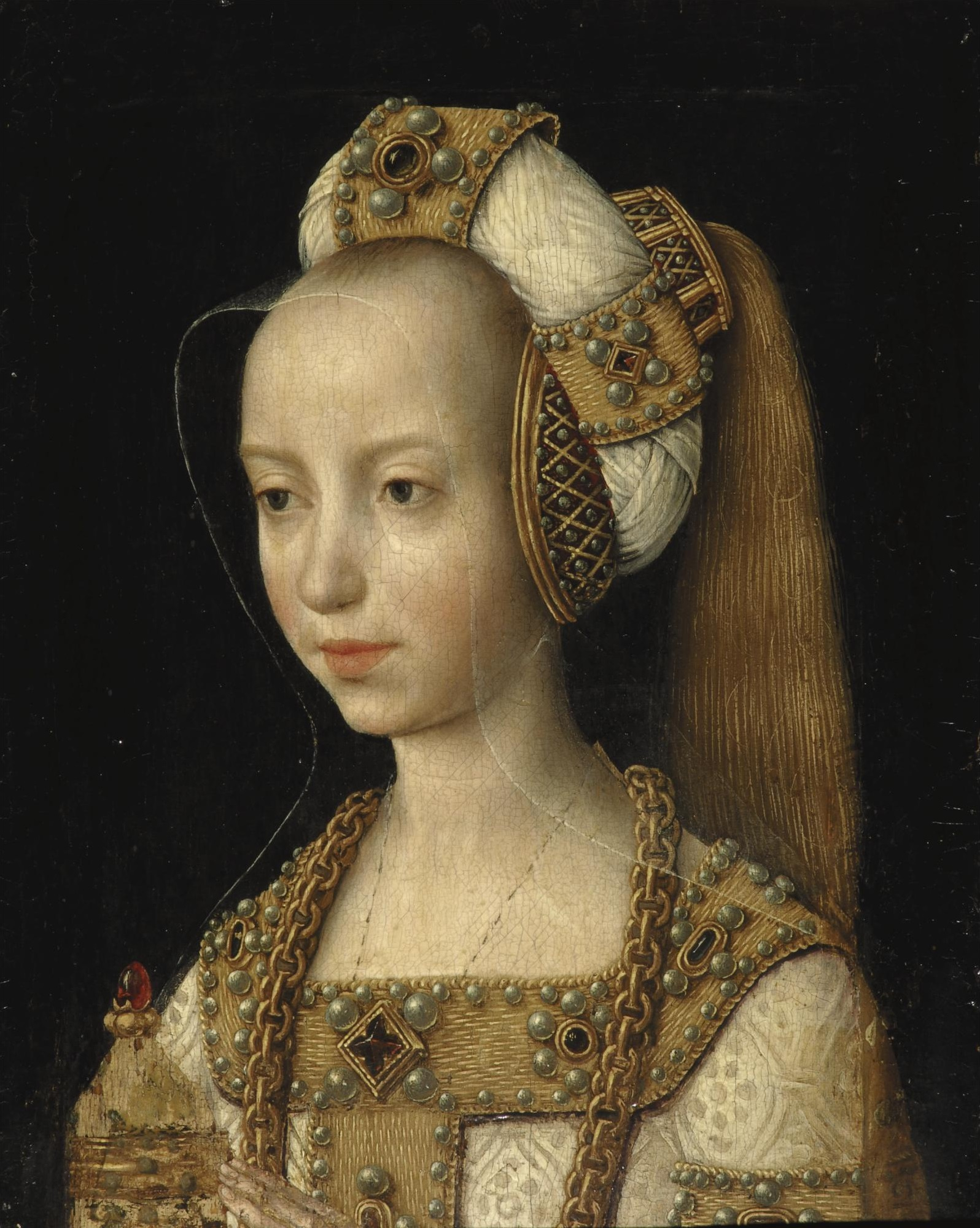
Mary Magdalene with an anointing jar, private collection

Thirteen versions of a portrait of a young woman in the guise of Mary Magdalene with an anointing jar are currently attributed to the Master of the Magdalen Legend and his workshop between the years 1510–1520. Some art historians believe that all existing versions are copies after a lost original. They were originally thought to depict Mary of Burgundy under the guise of the Magdalen, but it is now believed that the sitter was in fact her daughter, Margaret of Austria, Duchess of Savoy (born 1480). The pose of the sitter appears to be derived from the Magdalen in the left panel of Rogier van der Weyden's Triptych of the Braque family (Louvre). In the workshop version in the National Gallery of Art, London, the faint gilding in the shape of a halo above the head of the sitter implies she is a saint. She wears a dress similar to those worn by 16th century courtesans, which was representative of Mary Magdalene's sinful past. The jar of ointment which she holds was the usual attribute of the Magdalen, as she has often been identified with the woman in a story from the Gospels who anointed Jesus' feet with expensive perfume and then wiped them clean with her hair.

== Sources ==
- Campbell, Lorne. The Fifteenth Century Netherlandish Schools. London: National Gallery Publications, 1998. ISBN 1-85709-171-X
