= Miklós Boskovits =

Hungarian art historian

- Born: 28 July 1935; Budapest
- Died: 19 December 2011 (aged 76); Florence

Miklós Boskovits (1935 – 2011) was a Hungarian art historian who specialized in Italian renaissance art (and earlier).

Boskovits was born in Budapest. He wrote the Italian art catalogs for the Gemäldegalerie in Berlin (written between 1977 and 1980, published in 1988) and the Thyssen-Bornemisza collection (1990) before being asked to write the catalog of the Italian art collection for the National Gallery of Art.

Boskovits died in Florence.
