= Lionello Grifo =

Italian poet and writer

Lionello Grifo (born August 1934, in Rome), Italian poet and writer.

== Life and career ==
Grifo's parents were both Italian government officials. He started his working life in the world of politics and the press. He holds a PhD in Political and Social Sciences (Brussels, 1958) and has worked as a translator and interpreter in Luxembourg, Brussels and Geneva. After a second successful career in international marketing and consultancy he retired in 1982 for 15 years to Southern Spain to concentrate on his literary interests.

He was nominated at the unanimity "Premio della Cultura 2004 della Presidenza del Consiglio dei Ministri" (Prize for Culture 2004 from the Presidency of the Italian Ministries Council) "for his outstanding, prestigious contribution to the field of Poetry".
