= Grifo di Tancredi =

Italian painter

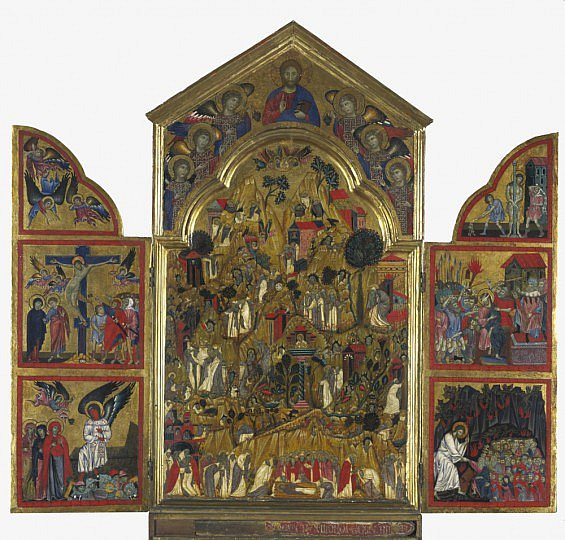
Grifo di Tancredi's triptych held by the National Gallery of Scotland

Grifo di Tancredi (active 1271–1312) was an Italian painter who was likely born in Florence. Little biographical history is known for this painter, and one existing work, a triptych at the National Gallery of Scotland, has been attributed to him on the basis of inscriptions. He was active in Volterra by 1271, and later moved to Florence. He was previously cited as the Master of San Gaggio.

In 1271, Grifo rented a workshop in Volterra together with Filippo di Jacopo. He appears to have worked on painting the Fontana Maggiore in Perugia in 1281. By 1295, he had moved to Florence, and enrolled in the painters’ guild sometime between 1297 and 1312. In 1303 he executed a now-lost painting in the Palazzo Vecchio, commemorating a political event of the day. Grifo is considered a follower of Giotto.
