= Museum of Religious Art (Certaldo) =

Art gallery and museum in Certaldo, Tuscany, Italy

The Museum of Religious Art' (Museo di Arte Sacra) is an art gallery and museum in Certaldo, opened in 2001 and (with the Palazzo Pretorio and the House of Giovanni Boccaccio) one of the town's three museums.

It is based on the site of a former Augustinian monastery in the medieval upper town its entrance is the next-door cloister of the church of Santi Jacopo e Filippo.

== History ==
Nelle sette sale del museo sono raccolte le opere provenienti dalle chiese comprese nel territorio del vicariato ecclesiastico di Certaldo. Il museo di arte sacra era in origine un convento agostiniano del quattrocento. Accuratamente restaurato per adibito a museo, è stato inaugurato nel giugno del 2001, parte di un circuito di centri espositivi della Valdelsa e di musei vicariali sorti nell'area fiorentina con il fine di aggregare beni culturali religiosi sparsi nel territorio che, per ragioni di sicurezza e custodia, non possono essere conservati nelle sedi di origine e che trovano perciò assetto museografico, visibilità scientifica e pubblica fruizione presso la chiesa più importante della circoscrizione ecclesiastica di riferimento.

== Room I: Art Gallery ==
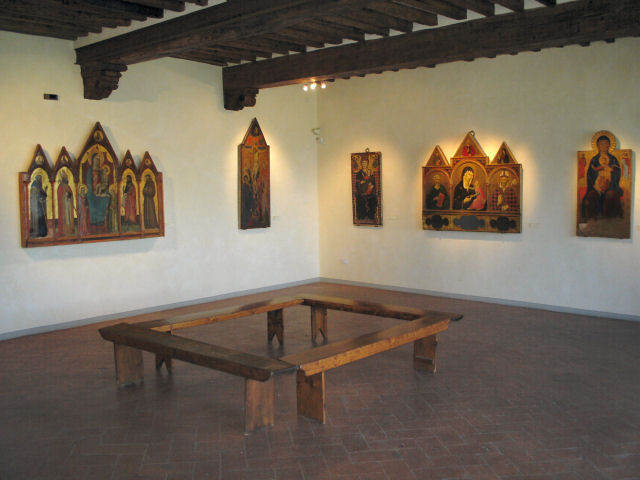
Sala I: Art Gallery

Sited in the monastery's former refectory, the first room houses 13th to 16th century paintings and two early 15th century fresco fragments.

=== Paintings ===
- Master of the Bigallo Crucifix, Enthroned Madonna and Child with Two Saints, panel, c. 1240-1245, from the town's church of Santa Maria a Bagnano
- Meliore di Jacopo, Enthroned Madonna and Child with Two Angels, tavola, c. 1270-1275, also from Santa Maria a Bagnano
- Ugolino di Nerio (attr.), Enthroned Madonna and Child with Saints Peter and Romulus, panel, c.1315-1320, also from Santa Maria a Bagnano
- Puccio di Simone, Madonna and Child with Saints, panel, sesto decennio del XIV sec. (1357?) from the oratory of San Pietro a Petrognano, then from the pieve di San Giovanni Battista in Jerusalem a San Donnino
- Cenni di Francesco, Crucifixion with Mourners, St Catherine of Alexandria and St Miniatus (?), panel, c. 1385-1390, from the Oratory of San Pietro a Tugiano, then the pieve di San Lazzaro a Lucardo
- Cenni di Francesco, St Martin and St Catherine of Alexandria, fresco fragment, 1405-1410, from the church of San Martino a Maiano in Certaldo
- Cenni di Francesco, Madonna and Child, fresco fragment, 1405-1410, also from San Martino a Maiano
- Pseudo Ambrogio di Baldese (Lippo d'Andrea), Madonna and Child, panel, 1430s, from the church of San Martino a Pastine
- Raffaello Piccinelli (attr.), Enthroned Madonna between St Francis and St Anthony Abbot, panel, 1522 (dated), from the church of Santa Maria a Bagnano
- Studio of Bernardino Poccetti, Circumcision of Christ, panel, 1590s, from the church of San Giovanni Battista in Jerusalem a San Donnino
Room I

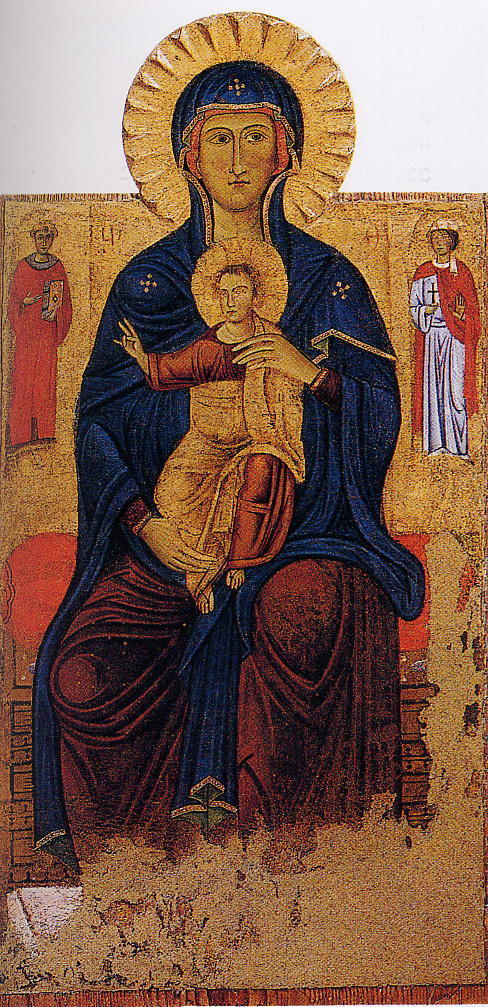
Master of the Bigallo Crucifix, Madonna and Child

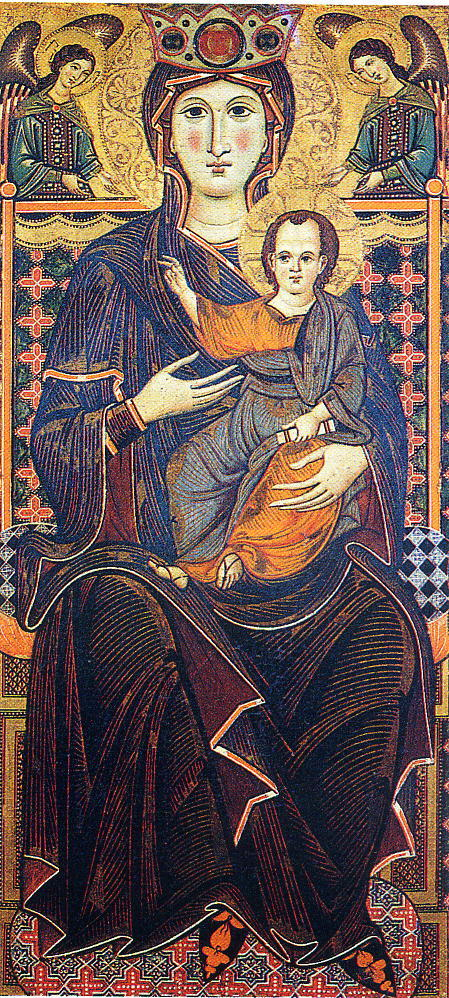
Meliore, Madonna and Child

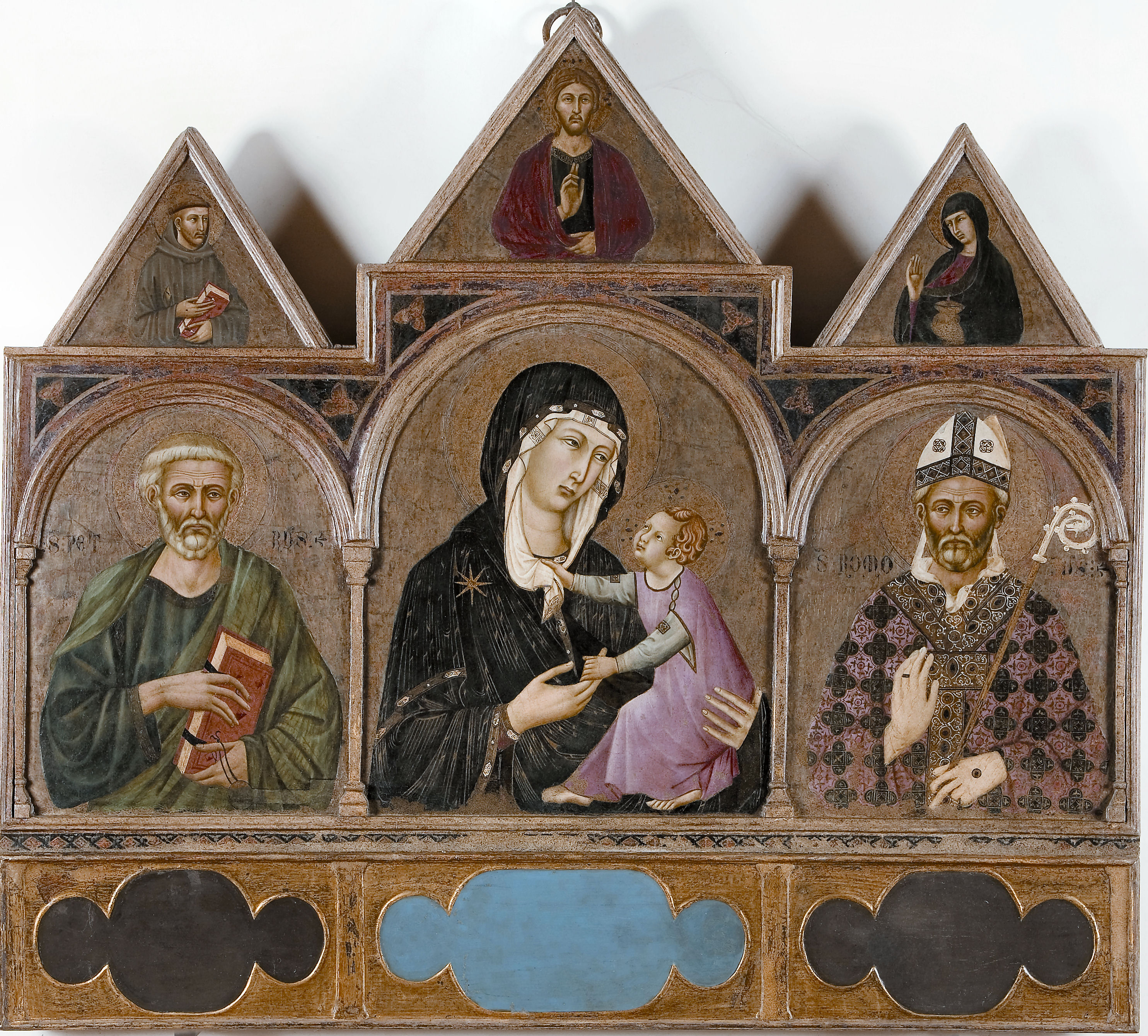
Ugolino di Nerio, Madonna and Child with Saints

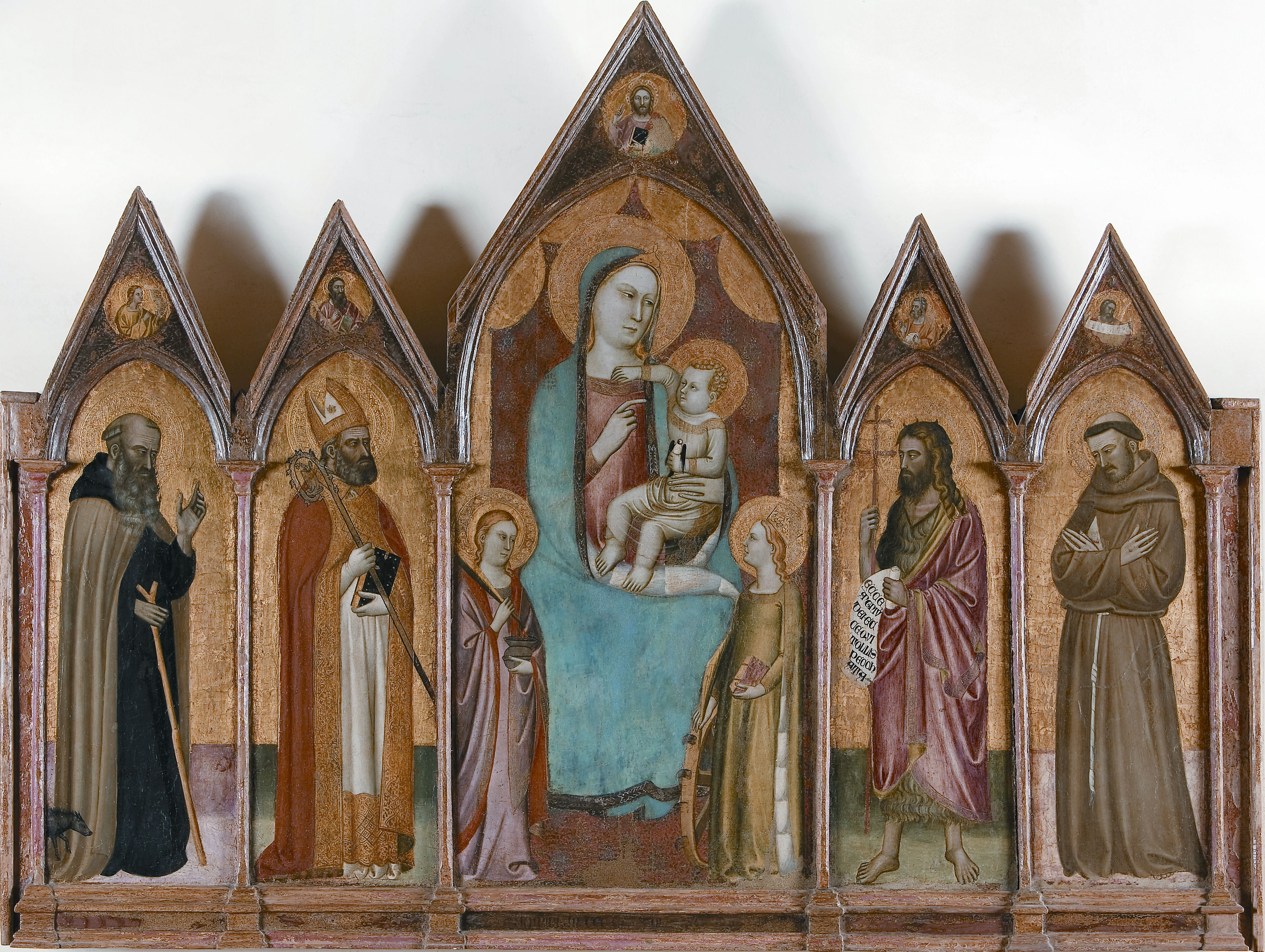
Puccio di Simone, Madonna and Child with Saints, 14th century (1357?)

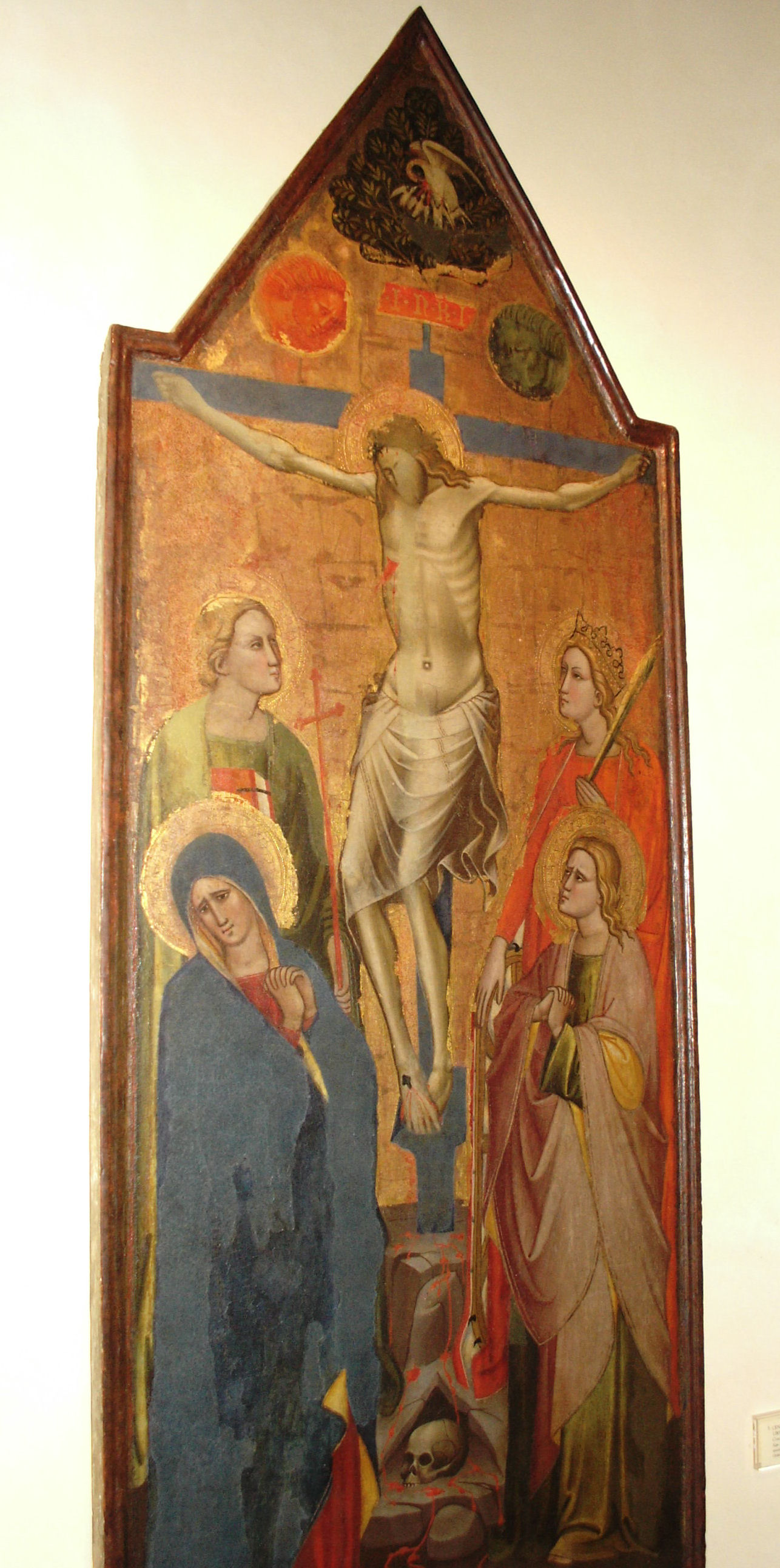
Cenni di Francesco, Crucifixion with Mourners, St Catherine of Alexandria and St Miniatus (?), 1385 - 1390

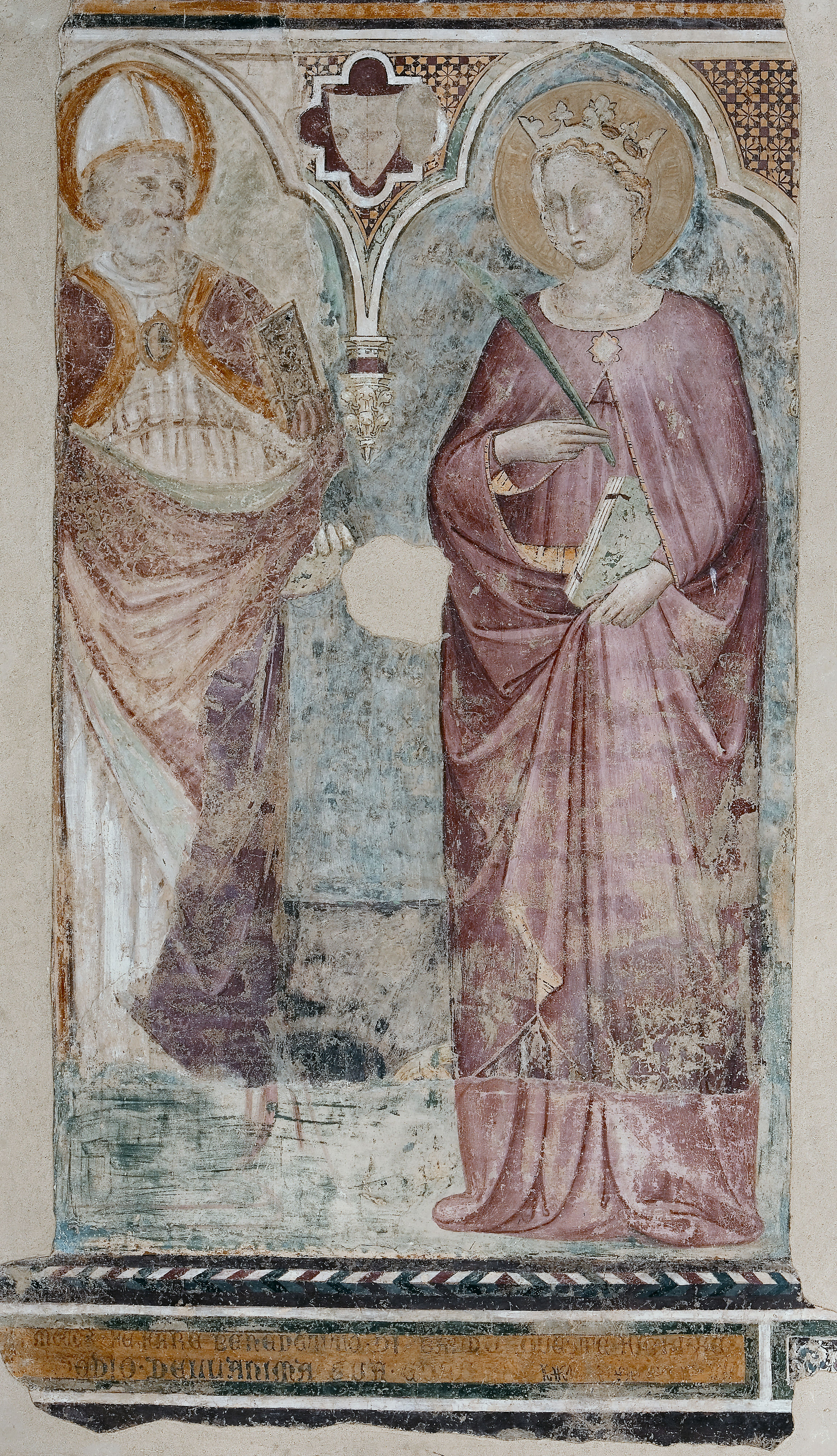
Cenni di Francesco, St Martin and St Catherine of Alexandria, 1405 - 1410

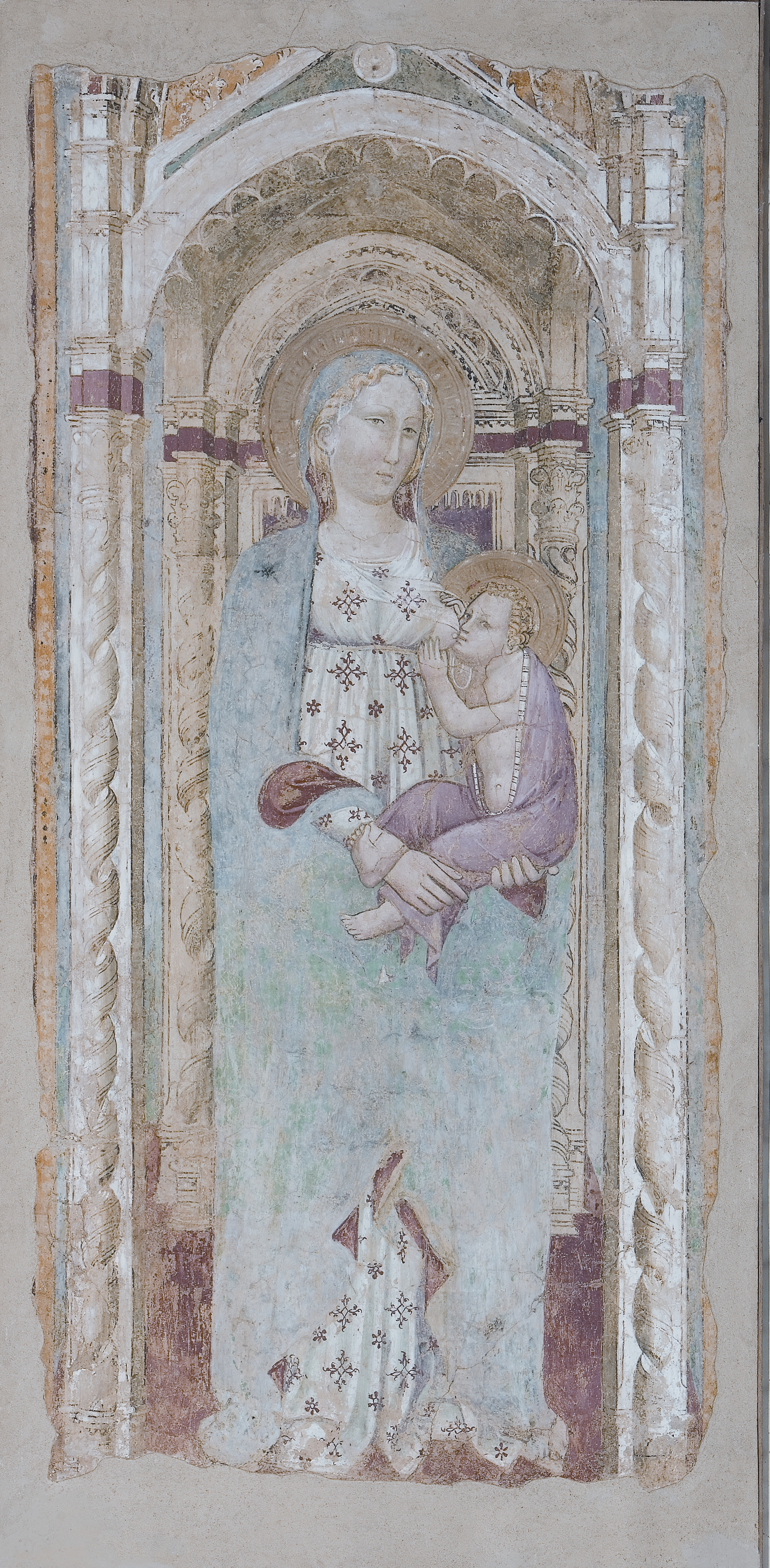
Cenni di Francesco, Madonna and Child, 1405, 1410

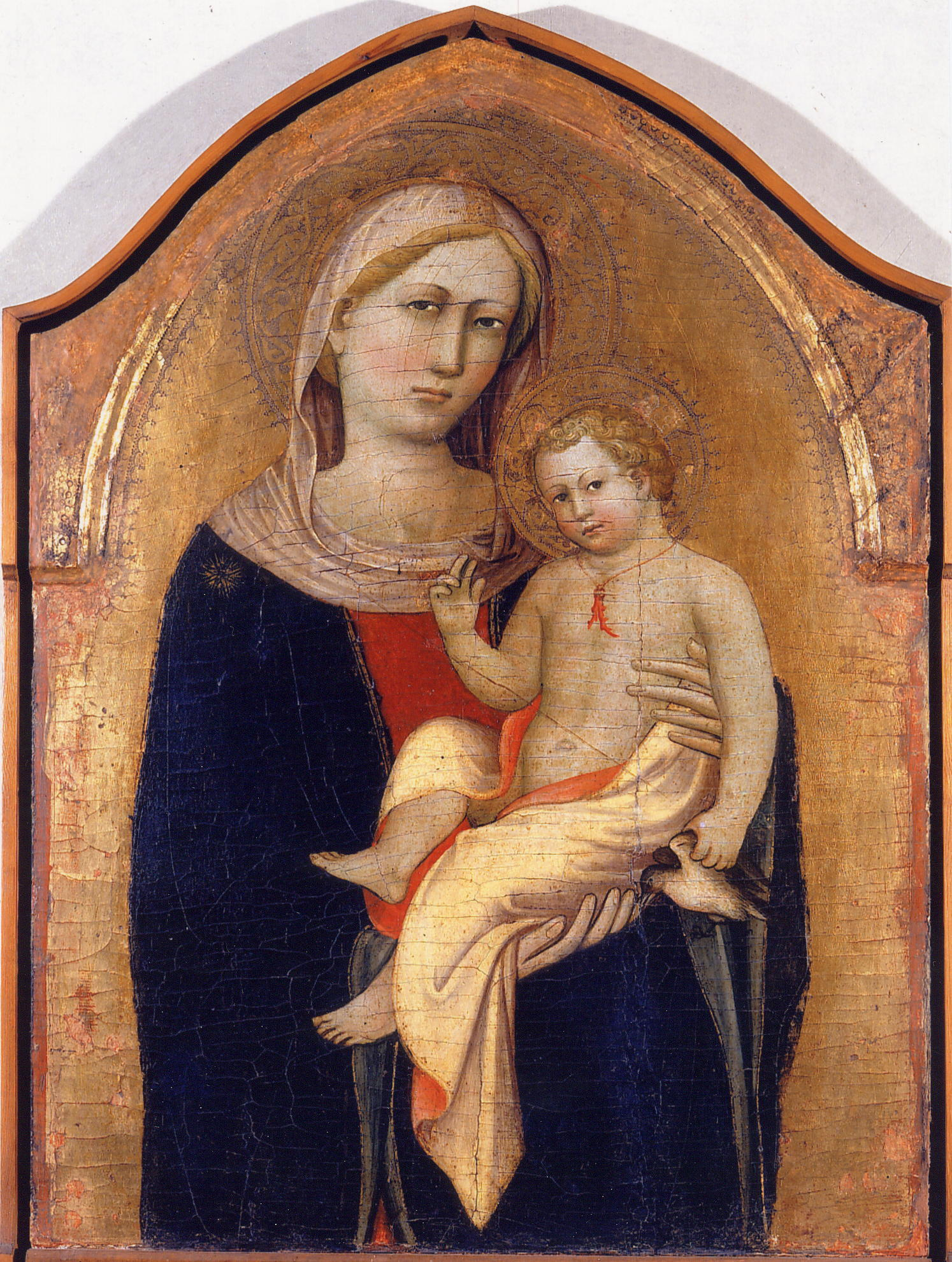
Pseudo Ambrogio di Baldese (Lippo d'Andrea?), Madonna col Bambino

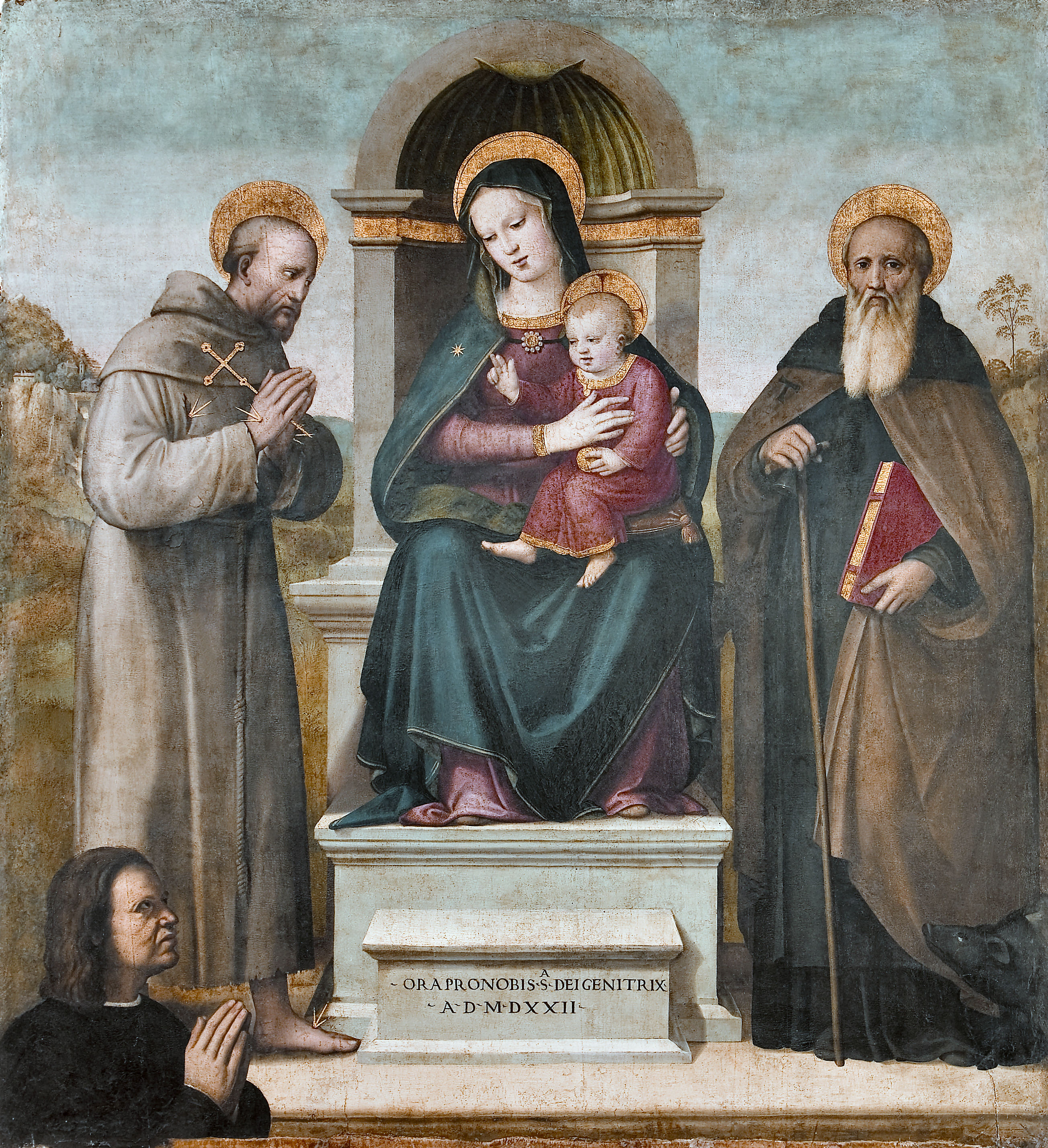
Raffaello Piccinelli, Enthroned Madonna between St Francis and St Anthony Abbot

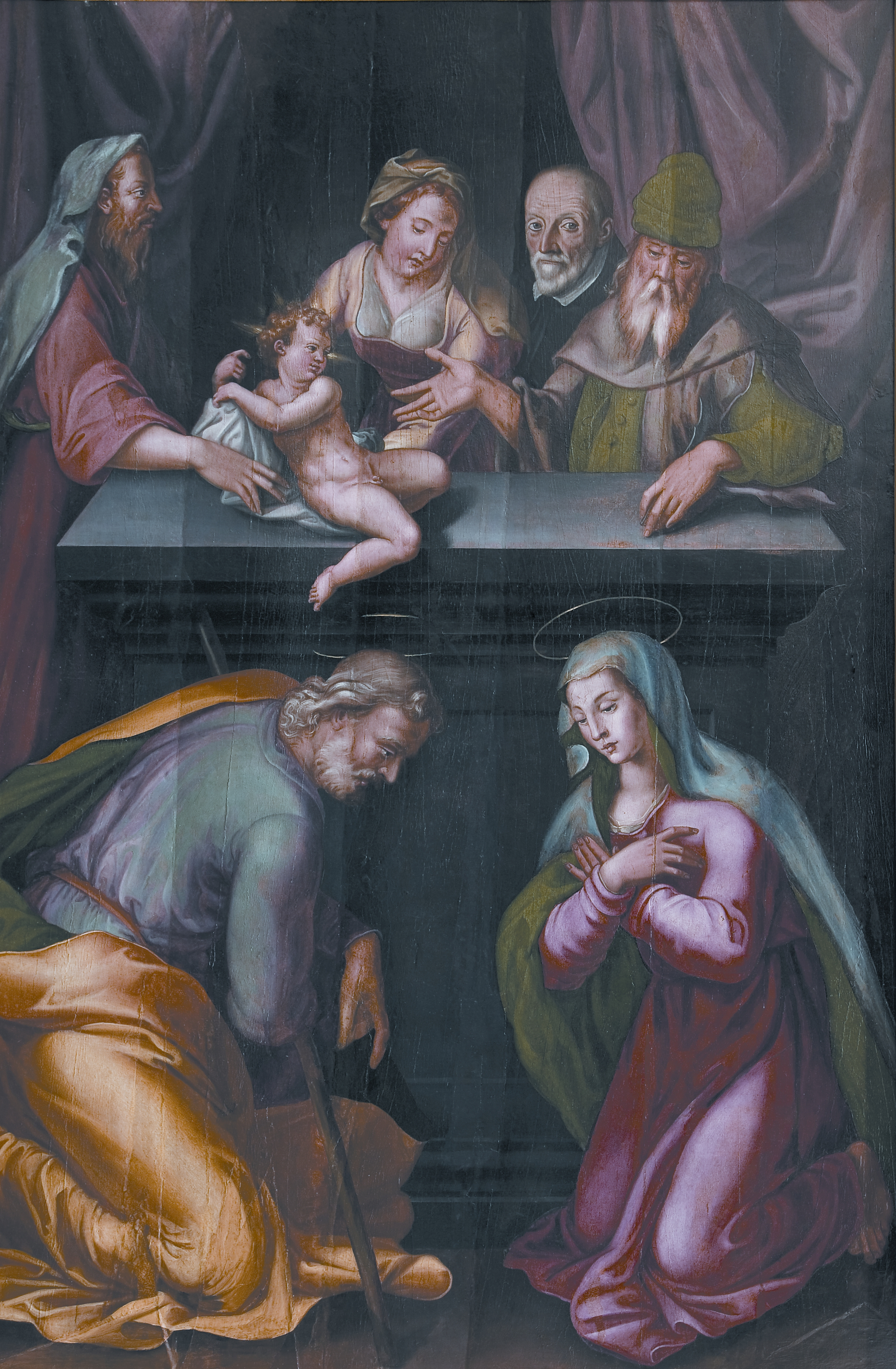
Studio of Bernardino Poccetti, Circumcision of Christ

== Rooms II, III, IV: Goldwork ==
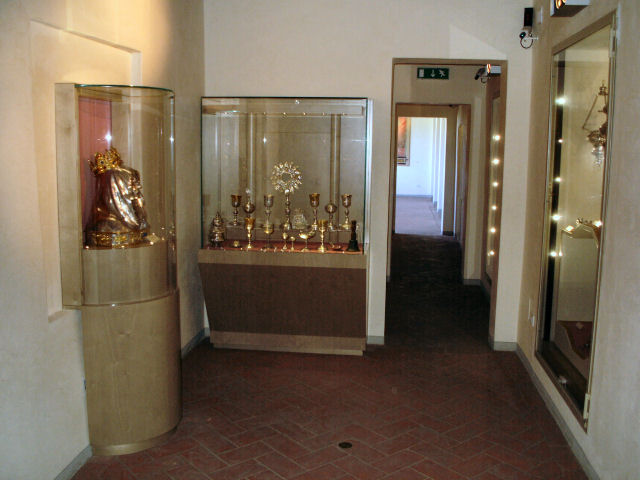
Rooms II, III, IV: goldwork

Three small rooms contain goldwork, mostly from San Lazzaro a Lucardo, a pieve of Certaldo, the most important pieve in the ecclesiastical deanery. They include (with display numbers):

- Workshop of Ruggero of Helmershausen, Minor Cross (n. 38), worked, engraved and gilded copper and cast bronze, mid 13th century, from the church of Santa Maria a Casale
- Possibly a Byzantine master, Thurible (n. 60), gold-copper alloy, engraved, 11th-12th century, from the church of San Gaudenzio a Ruballa
- Workshop of Filarete, Peace (n. 47), embossed, gilded and chiseled bronze, mid 15th century, from San Lazzaro a Lucardo
- Florentine studio, Chalice - Pyx (n. 48), chiseled, embossed, engraved and gilded copper, 1496, from San Lazzaro a Lucardo
- Paolo Laurentini, Busto reliquiario della beata Giulia, embossed, chiseled and engraved silver, 1652-1653, from the church of Santi Jacopo e Filippo

== Room V: Vestments ==
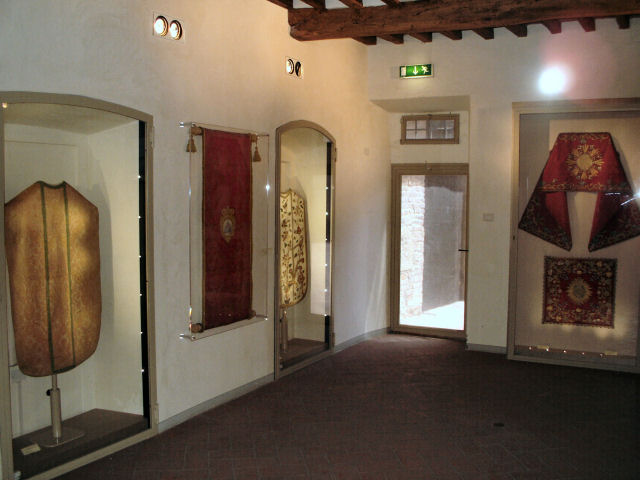
Room V : Vestments

This small room houses 16th to 18th century church vestments, including Pianeta (1750-1775) from Santa Maria a Bagnano in the town.

== Room VI: the Compagnia ==
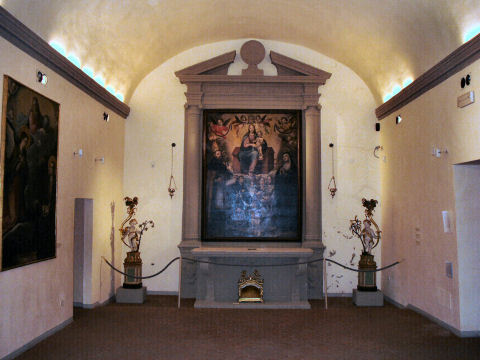
Room VI: The Compagnia

Previously the chapel of the Compagnia della SS. Annunziata and still consecrated for worship, this room describes the Compagnia's history with 17th century paintings and sculptures. Its duties included assisting those condemned to death. The connecting door to what is now Room V was installed on the complex's conversion to a museum - previously the only access was the now-closed door onto piazza SS. Jacopo e Filippo

=== Paintings ===
- Bernardino Monaldi, Madonna of the Rosary with Saints, canvas, 1611 (signed and dated), from the church of Santa Maria a Bagnano in Certaldo
- Tuscan painter, 1600-1650, Annunciation, canvas, c. 1620
- Sienese painter, Madonna and Child with Augustinian Saints, canvas, c. 1630
- Florentine painter, 1600-1650, Madonna and Child with St Anthony Abbot and St Francis, canvas, from the church of San Martino a Maiano, Compagnia di Sant'Antonio
- Florentine painter, Madonna of the Rosary with Saints John the Baptist, John the Evangelist, Anthony of Padua and Dominic, canvas, 1600-1650, also from San Martino a Maiano, Compagnia di Sant'Antonio
- Florentine painter, 1600-1650, St Martin and St Catherine of Alexandria Adoring the Holy Trinity, from the church of San Martino a Maiano, Compagnia di Sant'Antonio
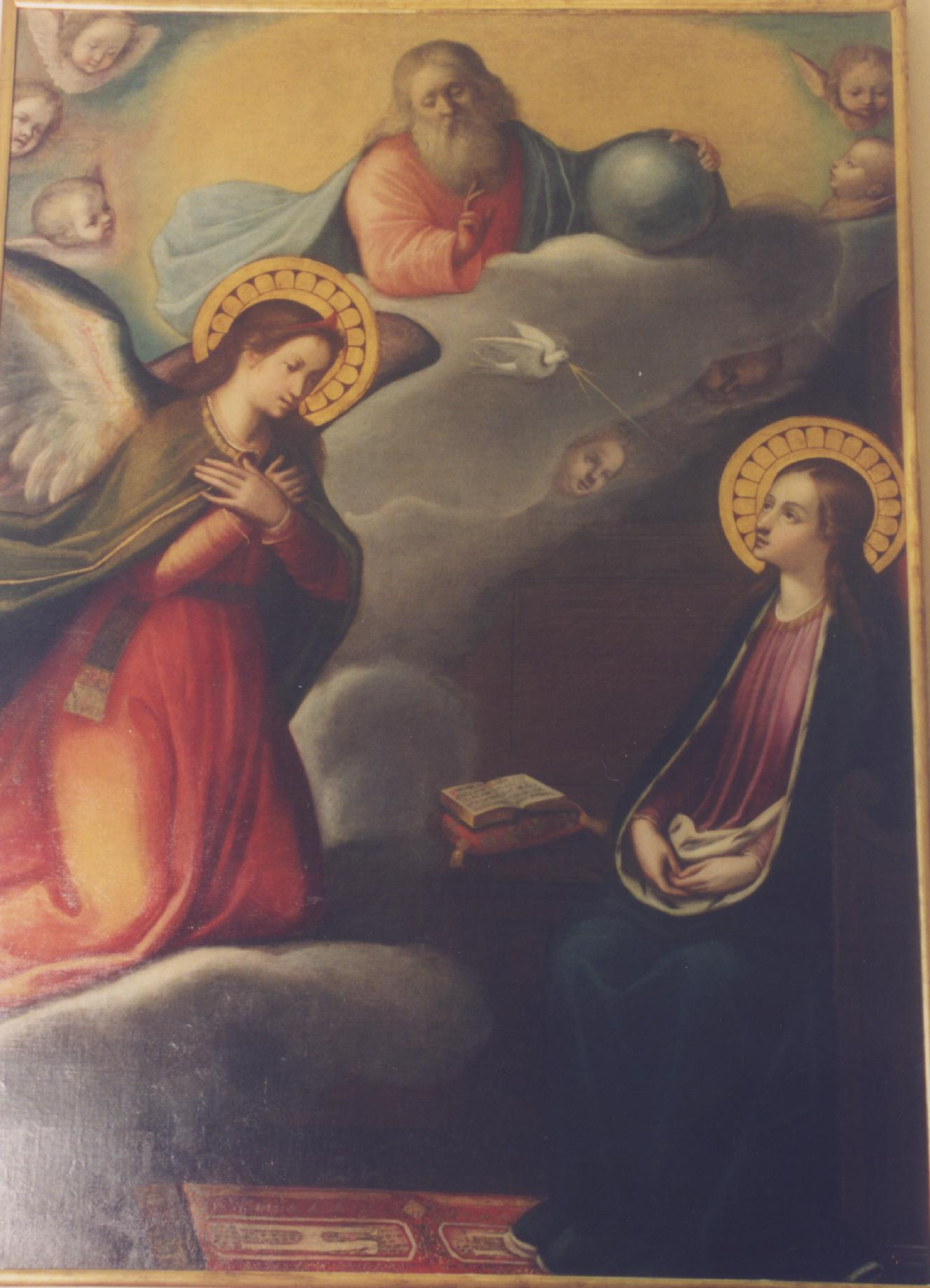
Tuscan artist, Annunciation

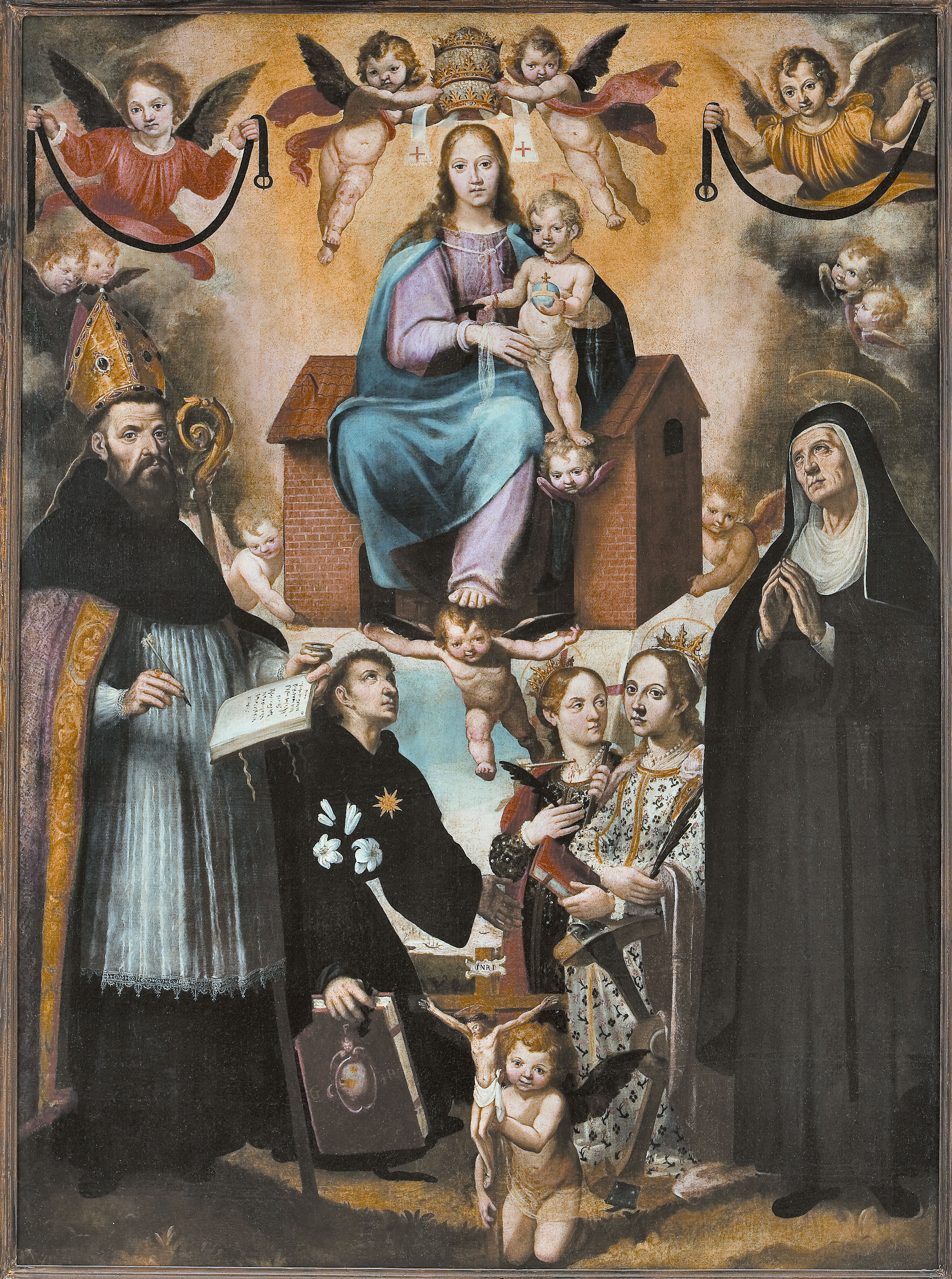
Sienese artist, Madonna and Child with Augustinian Saints

=== Sculptures ===
The room also houses two painted wooden tondo sculptures by mid 17th century Sienese carvers, both from the town church of Santi Jacopo e Filippo:

- St Nicholas of Tolentino, 1.62 m high
- St John of San Facondo, 1.73 m high

== Room VII: Linari Collection ==
The room was previously dedicated to the Petrognano Crucifix (also known as the San Donnino Crucifix), which has now been moved to the church of Santi Jacopo e Filippo. Since 24 August 2018 it has instead housed paintings, sculptures and prints from the Villa Bardi in Linari, a district of Barberino Val d'Elsa. The artworks include:

- Ciro Ferri, Moses with the Ten Commandments (signed and dated, 1683)
- Giulio Pignatti da Modena, Portrait of a Prelate (signed and dated, 1727)
- Five portraits of nobles and prelates, Spanish School (late 16th-early 17th century)
- Four Biblical prints by Nicolaes de Bruyn, including one signed by the artist (17th century)
- Print by Benoît Farjat after The Last Communion of St Jerome by Domenichino (1702)
- Wooden crucifix and two altar cards (early 17th century)
- Two volumes bound together in the 18th century, containing a large collection of prints on paper

== Bibliography (in Italian) ==
- Rosanna Caterina Proto Pisani, Il Museo di Arte Sacra a Certaldo, collana Biblioteca de "Lo Studiolo", Firenze, Becocci / Scala, 2001.
- Rosanna Caterina Proto Pisani, Il Museo di arte sacra di Certaldo, collana "Piccoli grandi musei", Firenze, Polistampa, 2006.
- Rosanna Caterina Proto Pisani (editor), La Valle dei Tesori. Capolavori allo specchio, exhibition catalogue, Musei del Circondario Empolese – Valdelsa, 12 June – 19 November 2006, Firenze, Edizioni Polistampa, 2006, pp. 154 – 177. ISBN 88-596-0068-5
- Angelo Tartuferi and M. Scalini, L'arte a Firenze nell'età di Dante (1250 – 1300), exhibition catalogue, Firenze, Galleria dell'Accademia, 1º June – 29 August 2004, Firenze, Giunti, 2004, pp. 94 – 95 (Madonna di Meliore), 160 - 161 (Turibolo di San Gaudenzio - qui erroneamente indicato come facente parte della collezione del Museo di Arte Sacra di Montespertoli), 170 - 171 (Croce astile di Santa Maria a Casale).
