= Christ the Redeemer with Four Saints =

1271 painting by Meliore di Jacopo

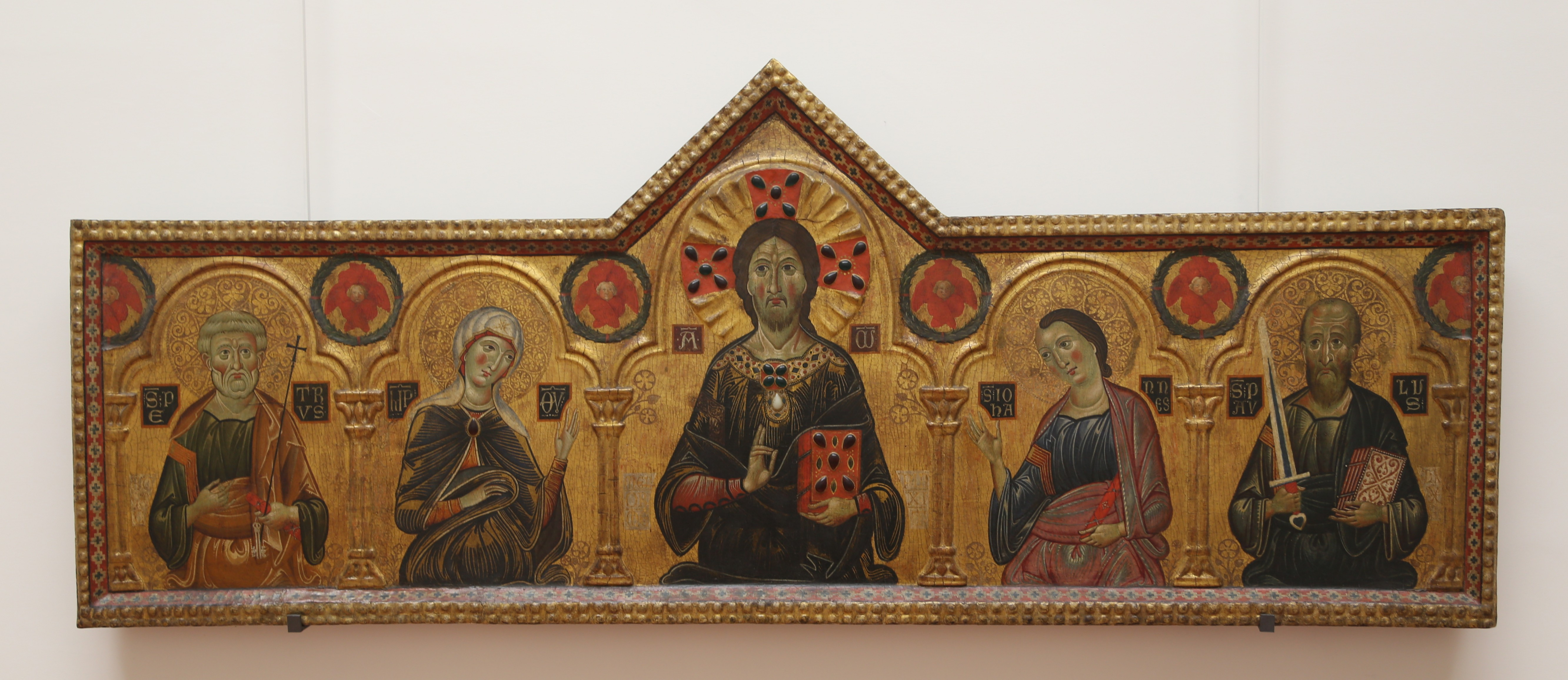
Christ the Redeemer with Four Saints (1271) by Meliore di Jacopo

Christ the Redeemer with Four Saints (Italian - Redentore tra la Vergine e tre santi) is a 1271 tempera and gold on panel painting, signed and dated by Meliore di Jacopo. From the left to right the saints are Peter, the Virgin Mary, John the Evangelist and Paul of Tarsus. It is now in the Uffizi Gallery in Florence.

Its original location and commissioner are unknown, though it may be the earliest surviving example of an Italian rectangular altarpiece. Sometime between 1450 and 1500 the seraphim in wreathes between the arches were added - Roberto Longhi attributes them to Cosimo Rosselli. It is recorded in the Stuart royal collection and ended up in Parma, where it and two other works were exchanged for Parmigianino's Turkish Slave during the Fascist era.
