= Santa Maria del Carmine, Florence =

Church in Florence

Coordinates: 43.7680°N 11.2439°E

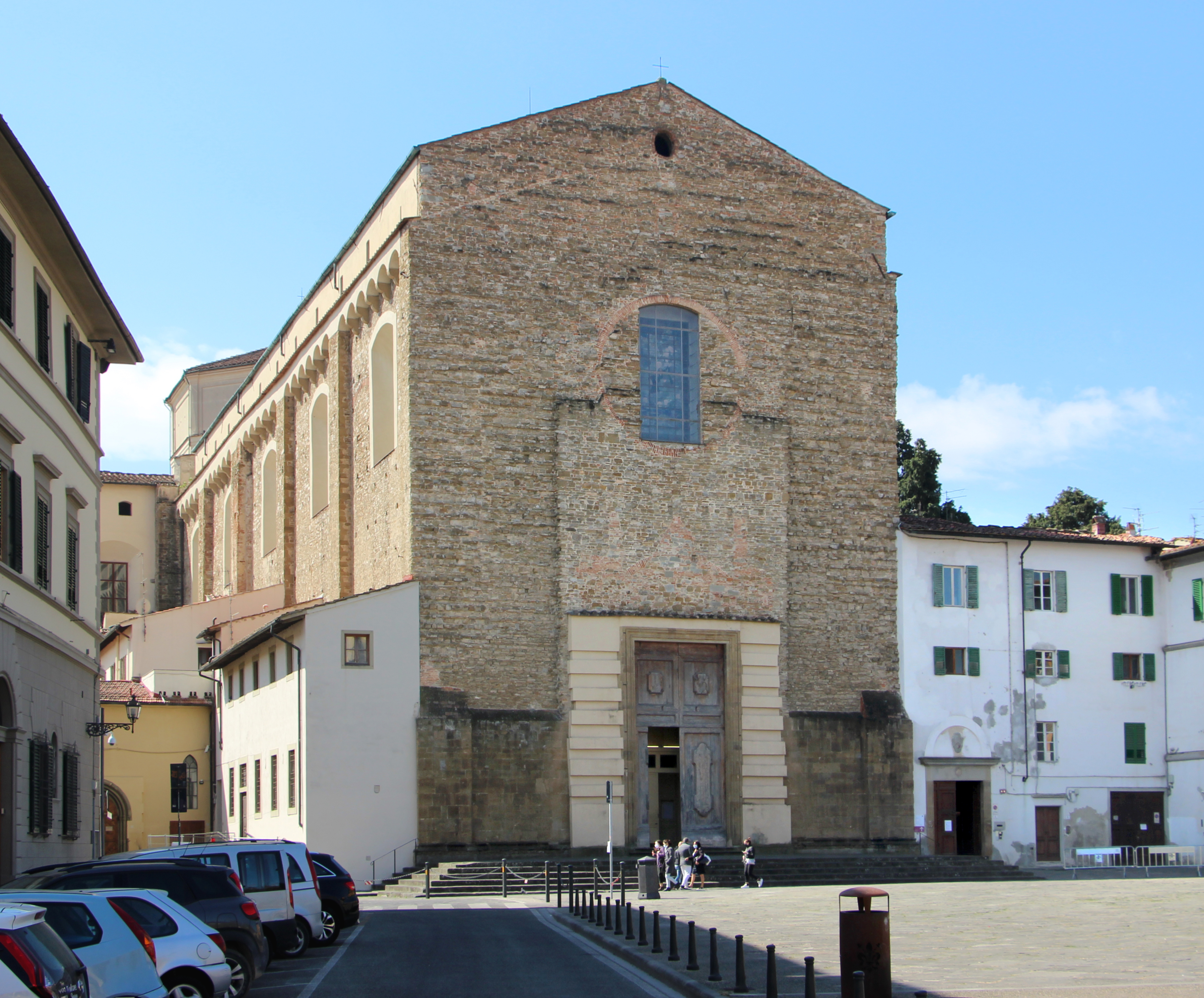
The unfinished façade.

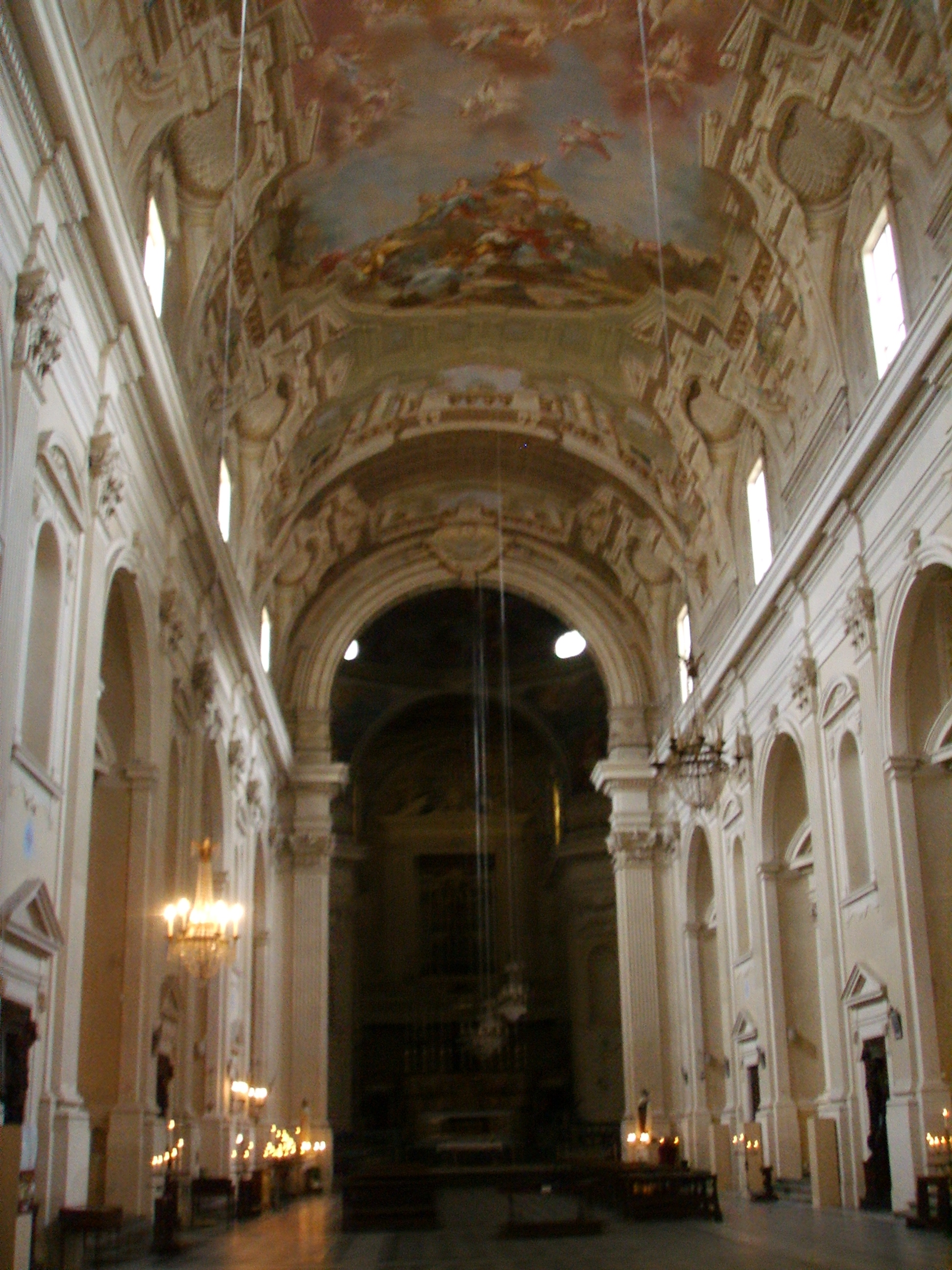
The interior.

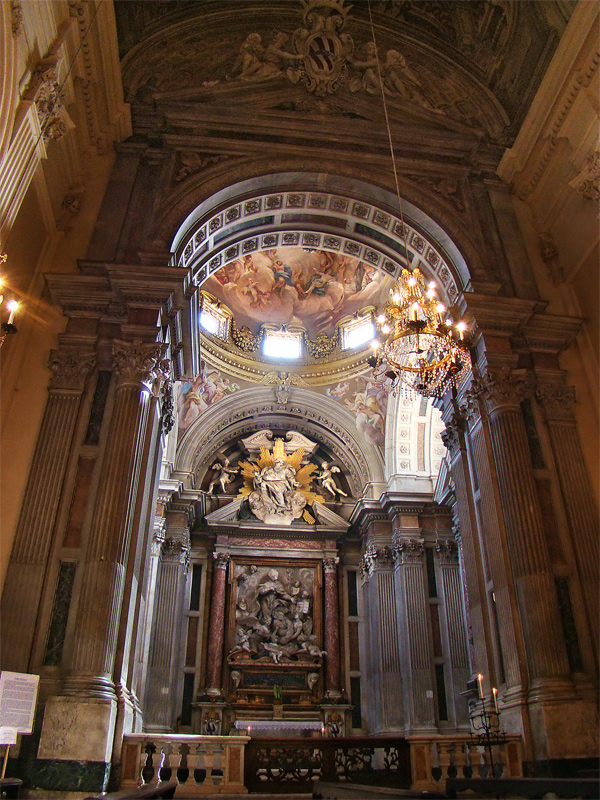
The Corsini Chapel.

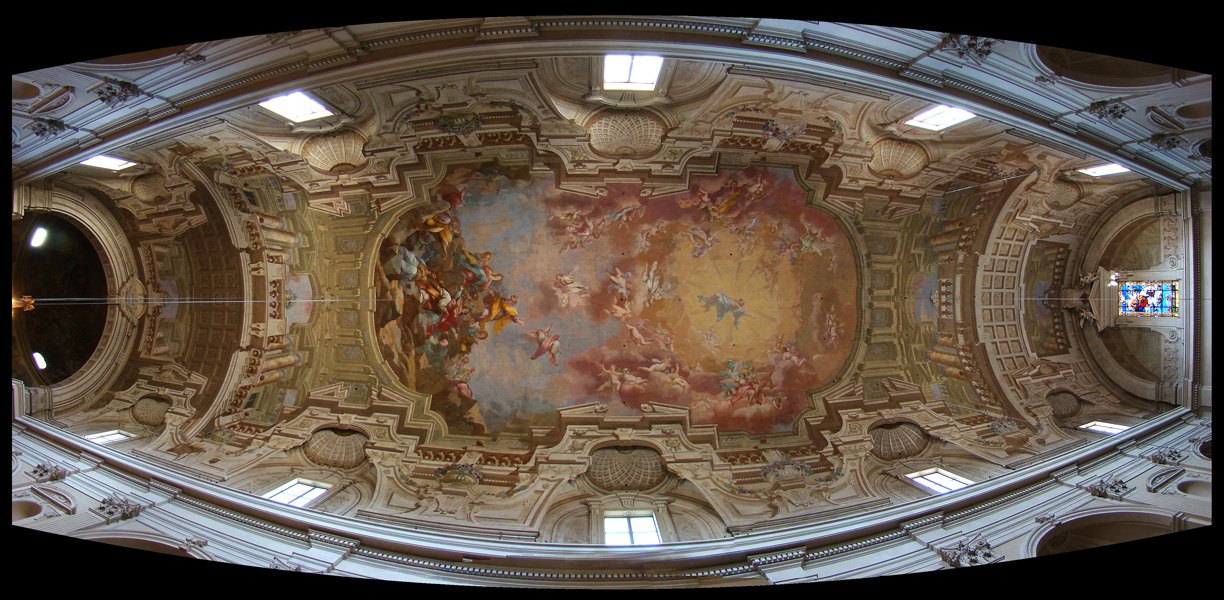
The vault of the nave by Domenico Stagi.

Santa Maria del Carmine is a church of the Carmelite Order, in the Oltrarno district of Florence, in Tuscany, Italy. It is famous as the location of the Brancacci Chapel housing outstanding Renaissance frescoes by Masaccio and Masolino da Panicale, later finished by Filippino Lippi.

== History ==
The church, dedicated to the Beatae Virginis Mariae de monte Carmelo, was founded by a group of Carmelite friars from Pisa. Construction of the church commenced in 1268 as part of the Carmelite convent, which still exists today. Of the original edifice only some Romanesque-Gothic remains can be seen on the sides.

By the 14th century, it was the seat of a number of lay fraternities. The complex was enlarged a first time in 1328 and again in 1464, when the capitular hall and the refectory added, though the church maintained the Latin Cross, one nave plan.

Renovated in the Baroque style in the 16th–17th centuries, it was damaged by a fire in 1771 which destroyed the interior of the church. It was rebuilt internally in the Rococo style in 1782. The façade, like in many Florentine churches, remained unfinished. The fire did not touch the sacristy: therefore have survived the Stories of St. Cecilia attributed to Lippo d'Andrea (c. 1400) and the marble monument of Pier Soderini by Benedetto da Rovezzano (1511–1513). The vault of the nave has a trompe-l'œil, quadratura fresco by Domenico Stagi.

== Brancacci Chapel ==
The Brancacci Chapel also survived the fire, and was saved by the subsequent restoration by the intervention of a Florentine noblewoman who was firmly opposed to the covering of the frescoes. The chapel is home to the famous frescoes by Masaccio and Masolino, considered the first masterwork of the Italian Renaissance. Masaccio's master Masolino, commissioned by a wealthy merchant, Felice Brancacci, began work on the chapel in 1425 and was soon joined in the project by his pupil, Masaccio. The scenes by Masolino are St Peter Healing a Lame Man and Raising Tabitha from the Dead, St Peter Preaching, and Adam and Eve. Those by mostly Masaccio are The Tribute Money, St Peter Healing with his Shadow, The Crucifixion of St Peter, The Baptism of the Neophytes, and The Expulsion from Paradise. Their treatment of figures in believable space made the frescoes among the most important to have come out of the Early Renaissance. The cycle was finished by Filippino Lippi.

The elaborated Italian Rococo ceiling is from one of the most important 18th century artists in the city, Giovanni Domenico Ferretti.

== Corsini Chapel ==
The Corsini, one of the richest families in Florence during the 17th–18th centuries, had this chapel built in 1675–1683, to hold the remains of an ancestral member of the family, St Andrea Corsini (1301–1374), who became a Carmelite friar and the Bishop of Fiesole, and who was canonized in 1629.

The architect Pier Francesco Silvani choose for it the Baroque style then popular in Rome. The altar has a marble bas-relief depicting the Glory of St Andrea Corsini, sculpted by Foggini, and above a God the Father sculpted by Carlo Marcellini. On the sides of the altar are two more Foggini marble bas-reliefs: one depicts Sant'Andrea descends girded with sword to lead the Florentines to victory during the Battle of Anghiari and the other recalls a Miraculous vision of the Virgin by a young Sant'Andrea (occurring in the church of the Convent delle Selve).

The small dome was frescoed by Giordano in 1682. The frescoes suffered in the great church fire, and were restored by Stefano Fabbrini.

== The convent ==
The cycle of the lunettes in the cloister was frescoed in the 17th and 18th-century with episodes from the Carmelite history painted by the Florentine artists Galeazzo and Giovan Battista Ghidoni, Domenico Bettini, Cosimo Ulivelli and Antonio Nicola Pillori. The convent suffered in its history from numerous disasters, from the 1771 fire to the 1966 River Arno flood. Most of the artworks are therefore fragmentary: these include the Bestowal of the Carmelite Rule by Filippo Lippi and the Last Supper by Alessandro Allori 1582, and remains of works from other chapels by Pietro Nelli and Gherardo Starnina.

The second refectory is decorated with the Supper in Simon the Pharisee's house by Giovanni Battista Vanni (c. 1645); it also houses fragments of frescoes by Lippo d'Andrea.

== Other burials ==
- Neri Corsini (1614–1678)
- Giuliano Dami
