= Meliore di Jacopo =

Italian painter

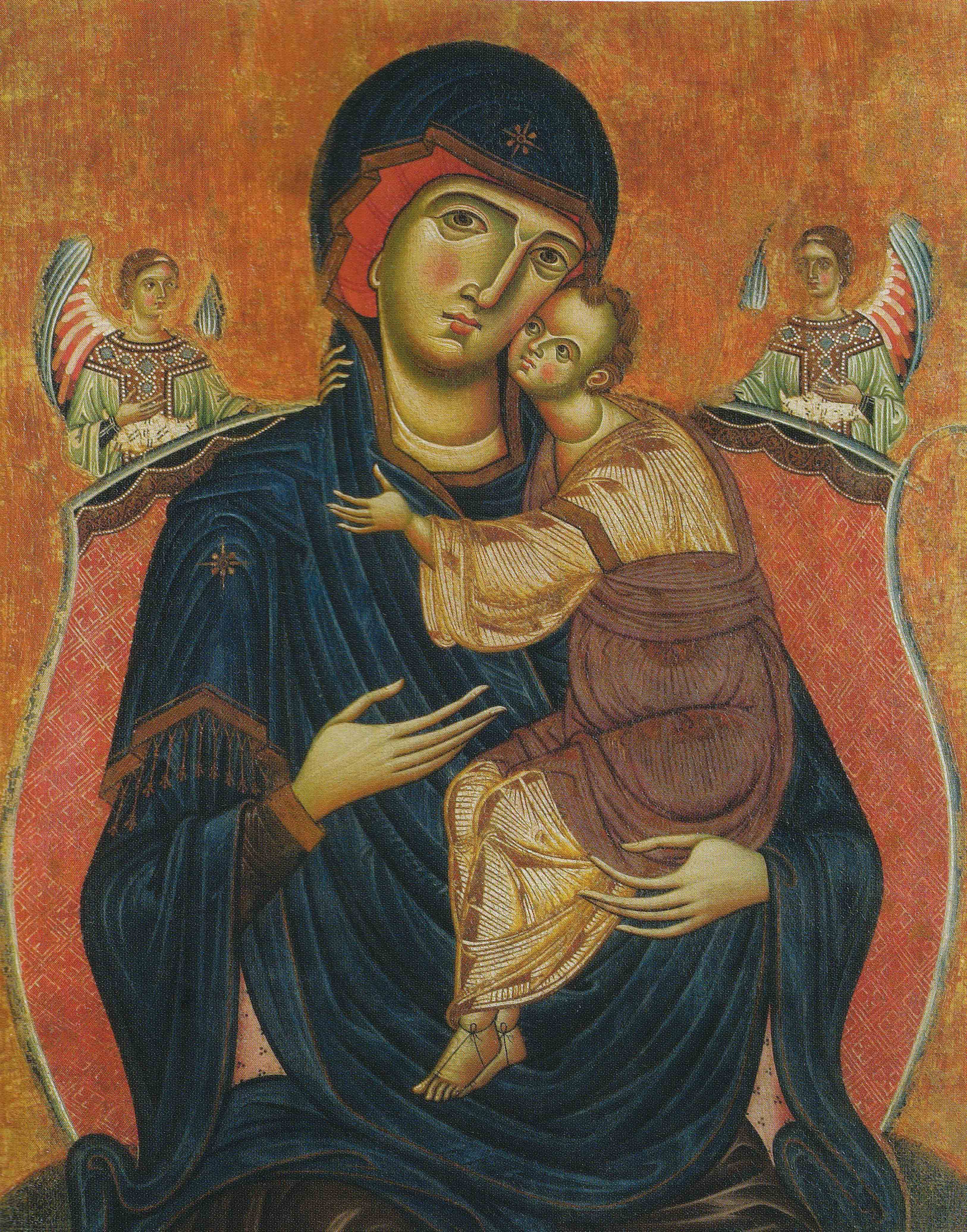
Madonna and Child with Two Angels

Meliore di Jacopo (fl. 1255–1285) was a Medieval Italian painter from Florence.

== Biography ==
The first certain reference to him is from 1260, when he appears as "Megliore dipintore" in a list of Florentine citizens who participated in the Battle of Montaperti.

His youthful works date from c.125o to 1260. They include a "Madonna and Child" from a church in Panzano (Greve in Chianti), the "Stoclet Madonna" in the Adolphe Stoclet collection and the "Madonna and Child" at the Art Institute of Chicago. Most of his works are influenced by the geometric stylization of the Master of the Bigallo Crucifix.

His later works are grouped around a key work that was signed and dated in 1271; an altarpiece, preserved in the Uffizi, which depicts Christ, the Virgin, Saint Peter, Saint Paul and Saint John the Evangelist. It represents a stylistic departure that is reminiscent of Cimabue.

Dated sometime between 1270 and 1275 is a "Madonna and Child with Two Angels"; originally at the church of Santa Maria, previously located in Bagnaldo, a district in Certaldo and now preserved at the nearby Museum of Religious Art.

His "Madonna and Child" in Montefioralle (Greve in Chianti) is one of his last works, after 1280, and shows the influence of novelties introduced by Giotto.

There is another "Madonna and Child" at the Museum of Religious Art in Tavarnelle Val di Pesa that has tentatively been attributed to him. It was apparently painted in imitation of Coppo di Marcovaldo, a companion of his from the Battle of Montaperti. Part of the mosaic decorations in the dome at the Florence Baptistery, created between 1260 and 1275, may also be his.

Many of his works were once attributed to an artist with the notname, "Master of Bagnano". Some were reassigned to Meliore by Roberto Longhi and the remainder are now assumed to have been the work of one or more of his apprentices.
