= Lippo d'Andrea =

Italian painter

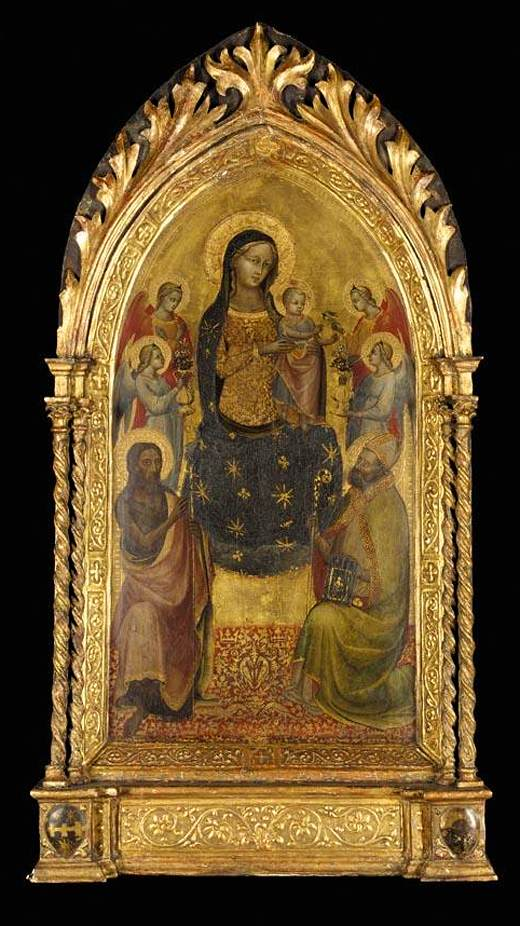
Lippo's 'Madonna and Child Enthroned'

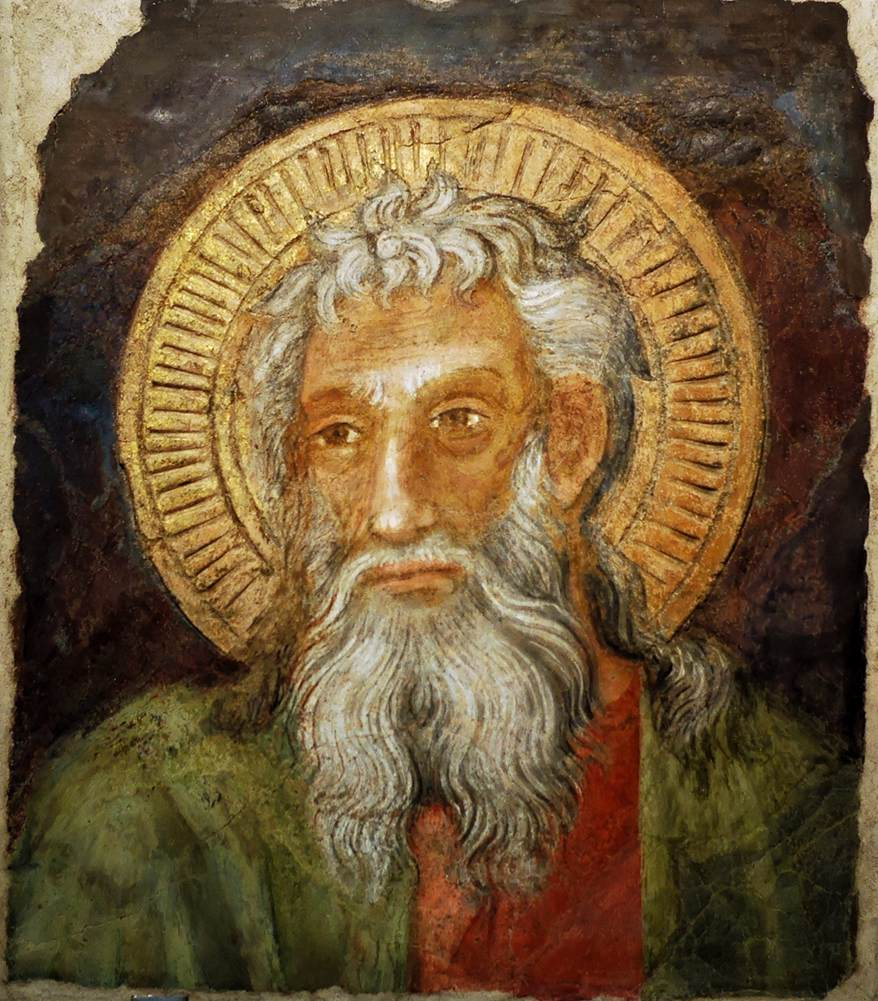
St. Andrew

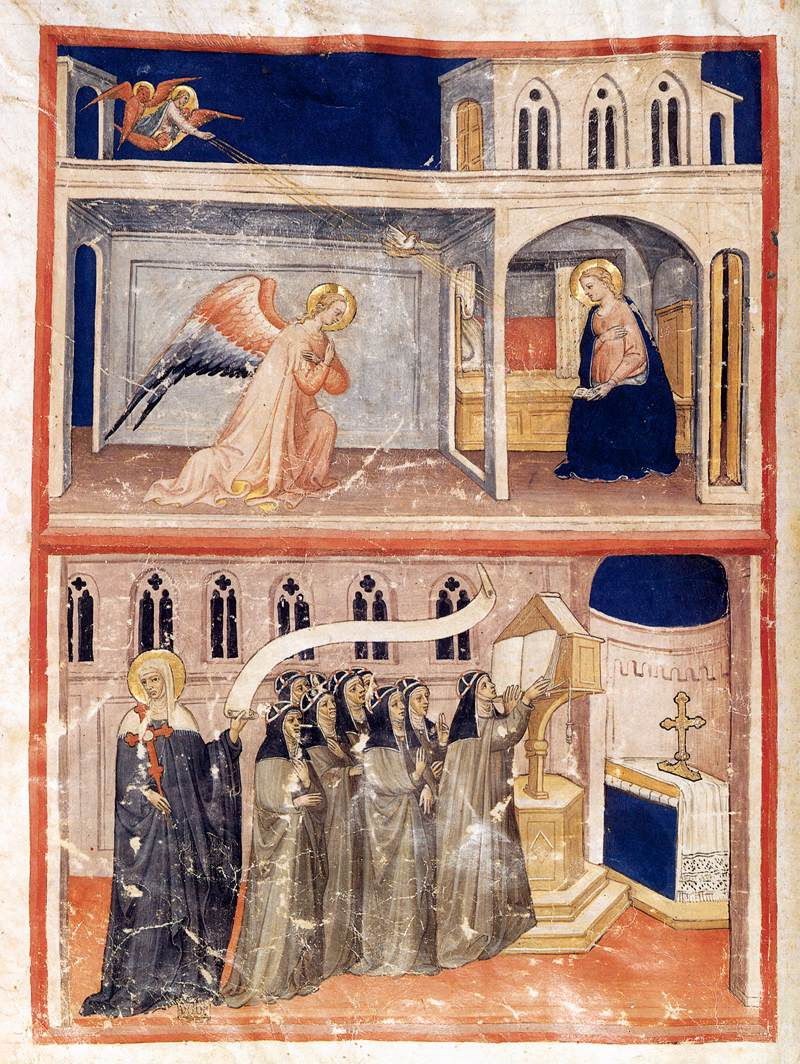
Brigettine Gradual,1435

Lippo d'Andrea di Lippo (1370/1371 - before 1451) was a Florentine painter, formerly known as Pseudo-Ambrogio di Baldese.

In 1411, Lippo d'Andrea di Lippo joined the Compagnia di San Luca. That same year he was commissioned, along with Niccolò di Pietro Gerini, Ambrogio di Baldese, and Alvaro di Pietro, to paint frescoes on the facade of the Palazzo del Ceppo in Prato. His name has also been connected, although without any documentary proof, to the frescoes in the Nerli Chapel at Santa Maria del Carmine, Florence; the appearance in 1402 of the name 'Lippo' has led to speculations that the creator of the frescoes was indeed Lippo d'Andrea. The other surviving reference to his name comes in 1435-36. That year, Lippo d'Andrea was a member of the group, which included Bicci di Lorenzo, Giovanni dal Ponte, and Rossello di Jacopo Franchi, that was given the task of painting frescoes of the apostles in the tribune chapels of Florence cathedral to celebrate the consecration of the newly built dome by Pope Eugene IV.
