= Master of the Bigallo Crucifix =

Italian painter

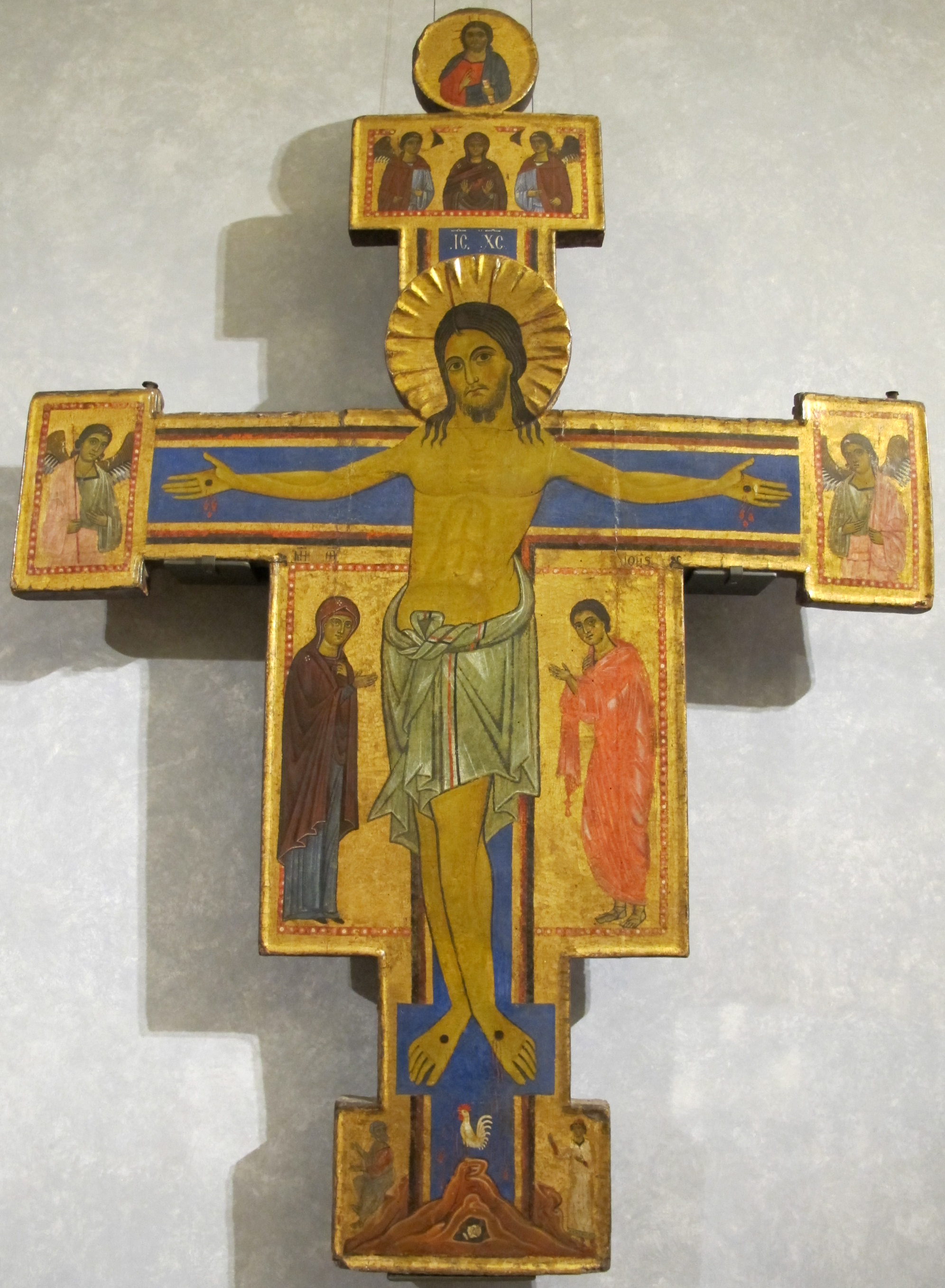
Cross in the Palazzo Barberini museum, Rome

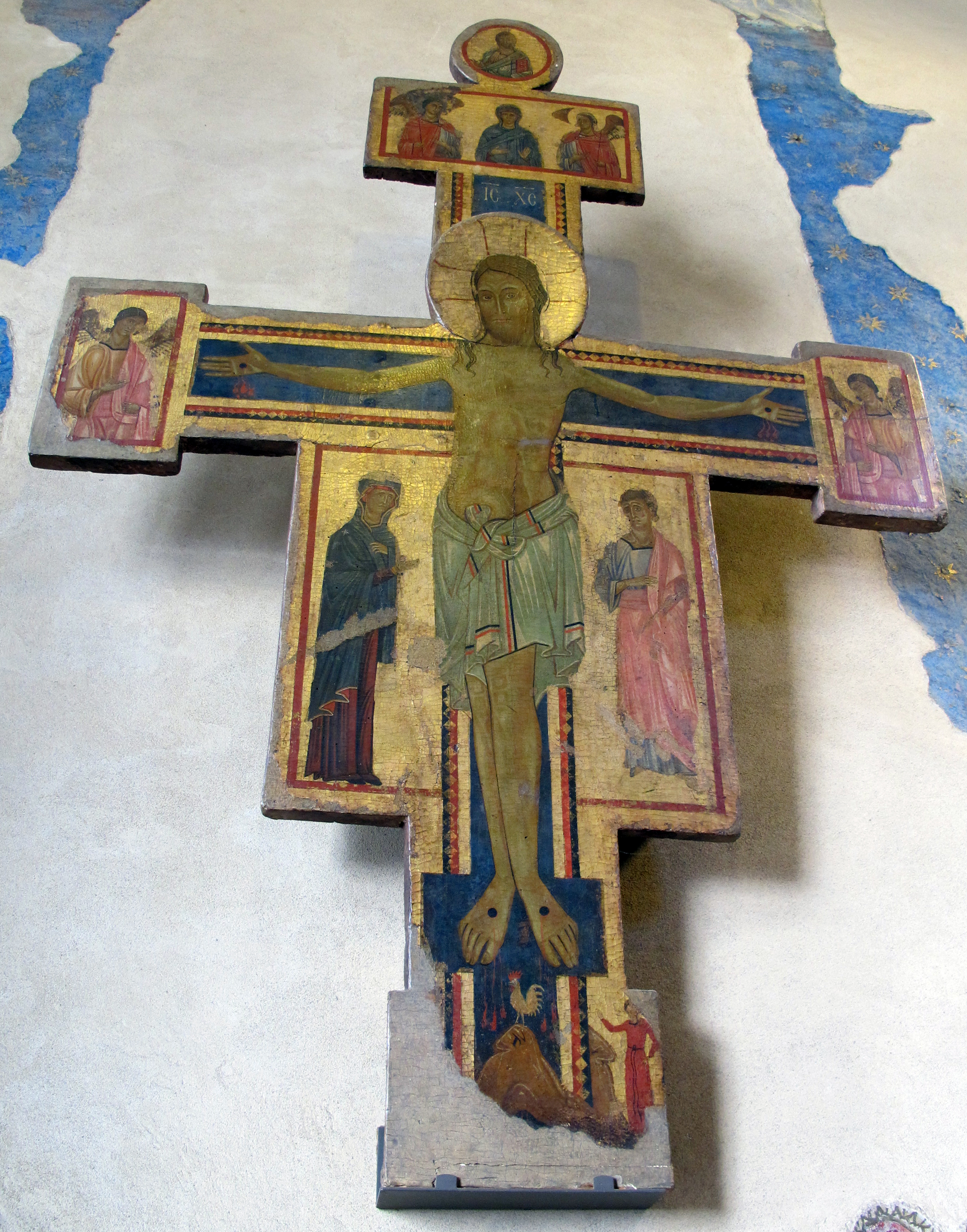
The Crucifix at the Museo del Bigallo

The Master of the Bigallo Crucifix or Bigallo Master (fl. 1215/20-1265) was an Italian painter active around Florence in the first half of the 13th century. He ran one of the first fully organized workshops before Cimabue, specializing in large painted crucifixes for churches, one of the main formats for panel paintings at the time. His notname comes from one of these in the Museo del Bigallo in Florence. A similar work is in the Palazzo Barberini site of the Galleria Nazionale d'Arte Antica museum, Rome.

== Life and work ==
His earliest established work is a dossal with four scenes, featuring Saint Zenobius, preserved at the Museo dell'Opera del Duomo in Florence. It was displayed at the Saint's actual tomb until 1439 and was created sometime during the term of Archbishop Giovanni da Velletri (1205-1230) when the altar was re-consecrated. A slightly earlier "Madonna and Child" at Fiesole Cathedral has also been tentatively identified as his.

The crucifix at the Museo del Bigallo likely dates from the first half of the 1230s. The "Madonna and Child Enthroned with Two Saints" from the latter half of that decade has also been identified as his, although the poor state of preservation makes this determination difficult. It was originally at the Chiesa di Santa Maria in Certaldo and is now kept at the nearby Museo di Arte Sacra.

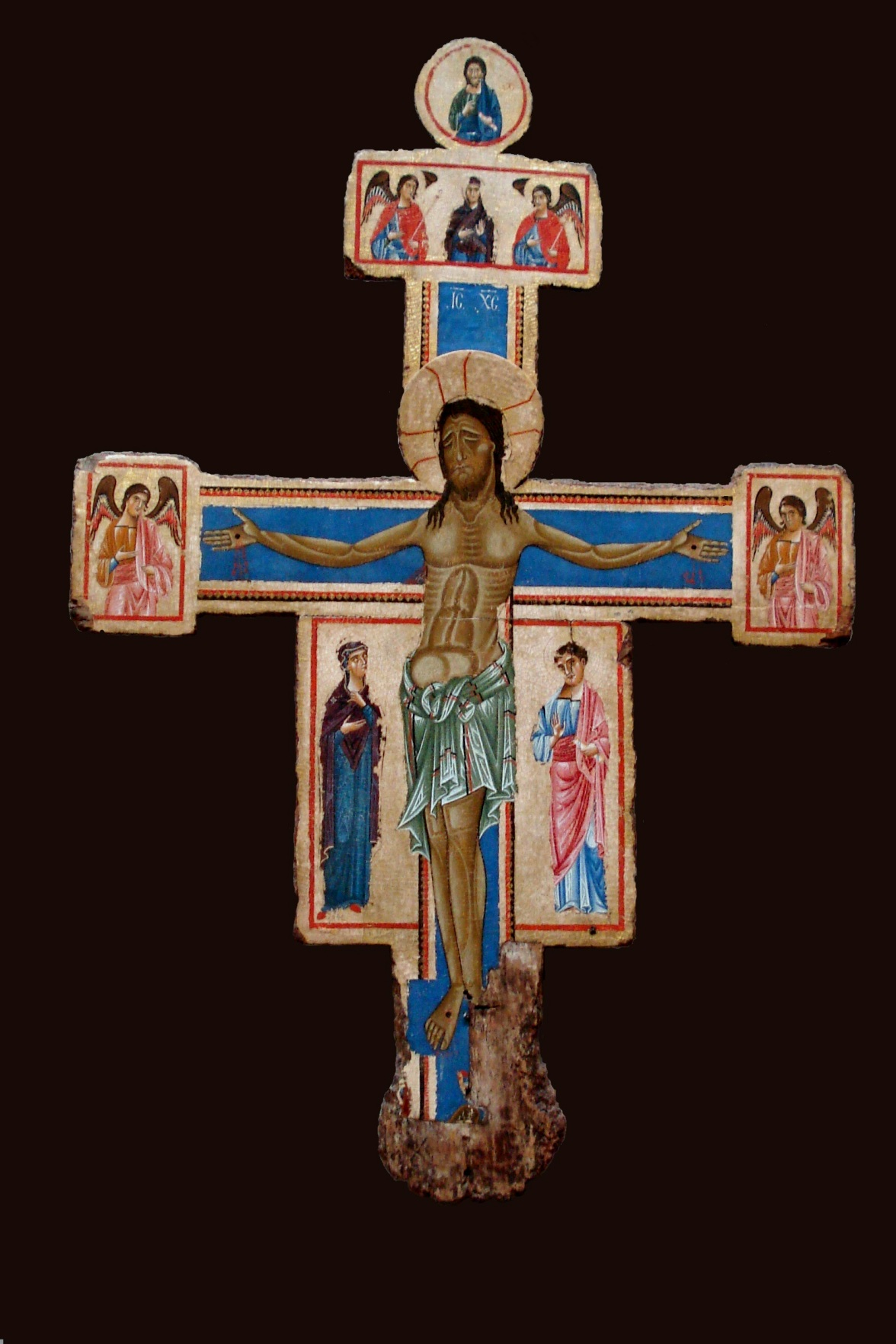
The Chicago Crucifix

The latest work known to be his is a crucifix at the Art Institute of Chicago. Unlike the others, which simply show Christ on the Cross, this one portrays him as "Cristo patiens" (Christ Suffering).
